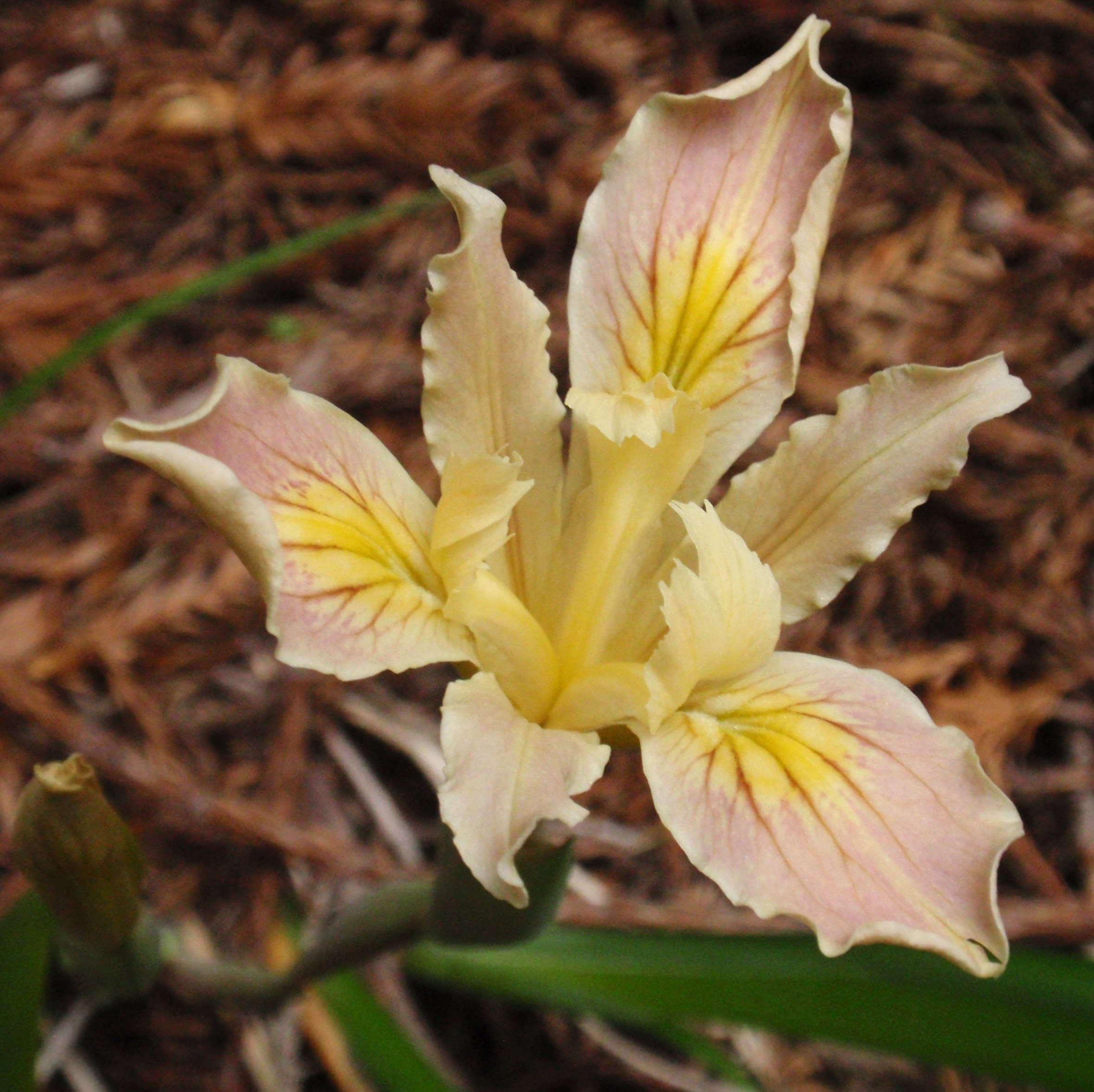

Scientific classification
- Kingdom: Plantae
- Clade: Tracheophytes
- Clade: Angiosperms
- Clade: Monocots
- Order: Asparagales
- Family: Iridaceae
- Genus: Iris
- Subgenus: Iris subg. Limniris
- Section: Iris sect. Limniris
- Series: Iris ser. Californicae
- Species: I. purdyi

Binomial name
- Iris purdyi Eastw.

Synonyms
- Iris landsdaleana; Iris macrosiphon var. purdyi

= Iris purdyi =

Species of flowering plant

Iris purdyi is a species of iris known by the common name Purdy's iris, named after Carl Purdy. It is found in the redwood forests of California and into southern Oregon, and hence is also known as the redwood iris. The plant flowers from April to June.

== Description ==
=== Leaves ===
The leaves are green and usually tinted along the edges with pink. There is a closed spathe which is green with red edges.

=== Flowers ===
The flowers are light yellow and lavender, often veined with darker coloring, and are hermaphrodite. The stigma is rounded, truncate or bilobed and often edged with small teeth, it is the only species of Iris ser. Californicae not to have a triangular or tongue shaped stigma.

=== Seeds ===
The seeds are D-shaped or irregular, light brown and wrinkled.

== Status ==
While once common, disturbance caused by logging and opening up new highways has allowed other species to move in, in particular I. douglasiana and I. macrosiphon, and the resulting hybrids are abundant.

== Location ==
The iris is found in Humboldt, Mendocino, Sonoma and Trinity counties in California, and in southern Oregon.

== Hybridization ==
Iris purdyi hybridizes with I. bracteata, I. chrysophylla, I. douglasiana, I. innominata, I. macrosiphon, I. tenax, and I. tenuissima.

It is rare in its unhybridized form.

The cross with I. tenax, called "Iota", was made by the Englishman William Dykes, and was the first Californian Iris to win a Royal Horticultural Society Award of Merit, in 1914.

== Uses ==
Traditional uses by native Americans were as a source of fibre to make rope, using the outside fibres from each leaf. The leaves can also be used to make a light tan paper.
