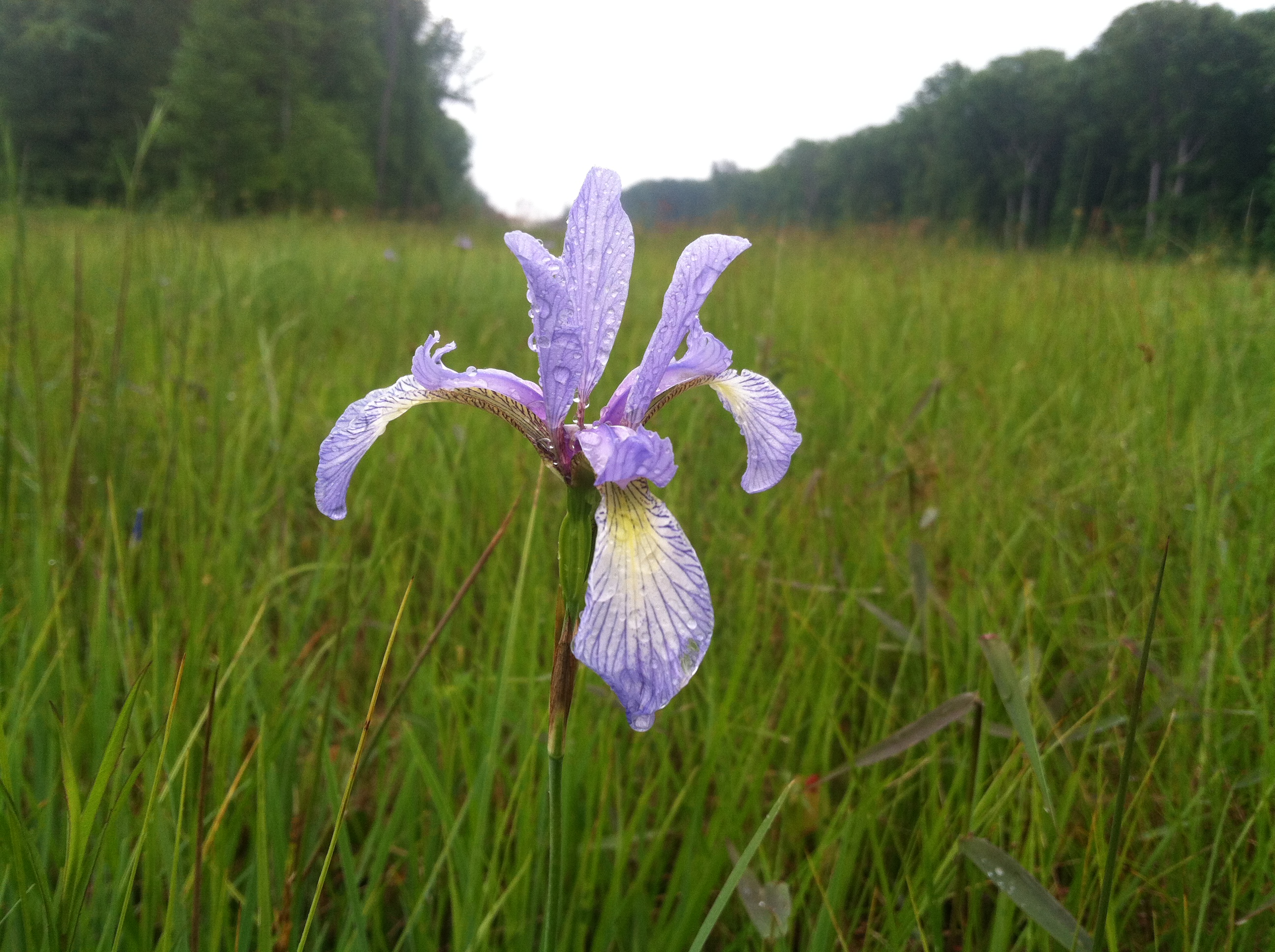

Conservation status
- Least Concern (IUCN 3.1)

- Apparently Secure (NatureServe)

Scientific classification
- Kingdom: Plantae
- Clade: Embryophytes
- Clade: Tracheophytes
- Clade: Spermatophytes
- Clade: Angiosperms
- Clade: Monocots
- Order: Asparagales
- Family: Iridaceae
- Genus: Iris
- Subgenus: Iris subg. Limniris
- Section: Iris sect. Limniris
- Series: Iris ser. Prismaticae
- Species: I. prismatica

Binomial name
- Iris prismatica Pursh

Synonyms
- Iris boltoniana Schult.; Iris gracilis Bigelow; Iris prismatica var. austrina Fernald; Iris sibirica var. trigonocarpa Baker; Iris trigonocarpa A.Br. & Bouché; Limniris prismatica (Pursh) Rodion.

= Iris prismatica =

Slender blue flag

Species of flowering plant

Iris prismatica, the slender blue flag or cubeseed iris, is a plant species native to the Canadian provinces of Ontario and Nova Scotia, as well as to parts of the southern and eastern United States from Maine south to Alabama.

Iris prismatica is a perennial herb spreading by means of rhizomes that are close to the surface of the soil. Flowering stalks can reach a height of 80 cm. Leaves are long and narrow, up to 60 cm long but rarely more than 5 mm across. It has 2–3 blooms in May. Flowers are pale blue to blue-violet. It tends to grow in swampy, wet conditions, and within the United States, it is currently state listed as 'threatened' in Maine, New Hampshire, New York, and Tennessee, and state listed as 'endangered' in Maryland and Pennsylvania. It is cold hardy to USDA Zone 3.
