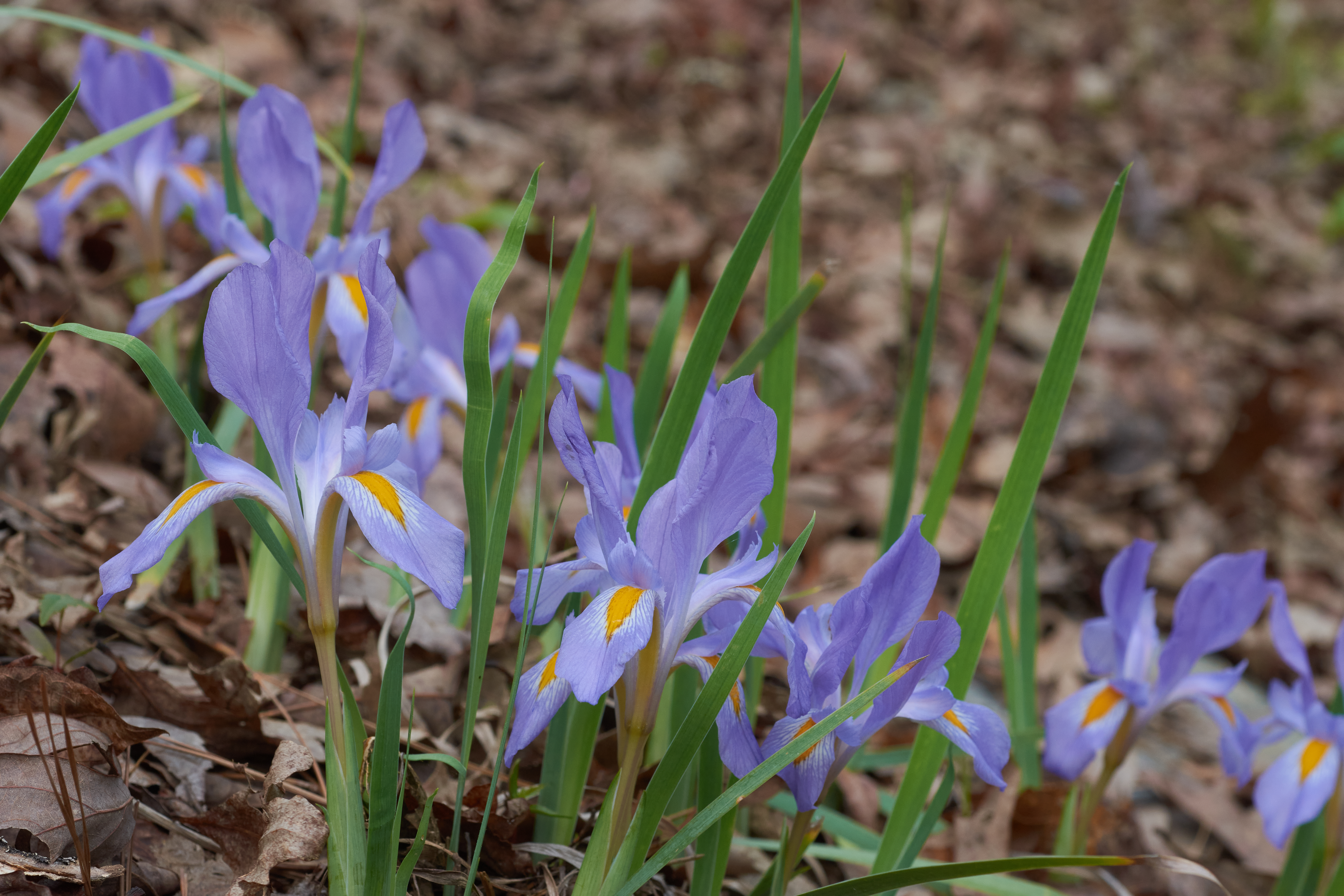
- A blooming clump of Iris verna var. smalliana

Scientific classification
- Kingdom: Plantae
- Clade: Tracheophytes
- Clade: Angiosperms
- Clade: Monocots
- Order: Asparagales
- Family: Iridaceae
- Genus: Iris
- Subgenus: Iris subg. Limniris
- Section: Iris sect. Limniris
- Series: Iris ser. Vernae
- Species: I. verna

Binomial name
- Iris verna L.

= Iris verna =

Species of flowering plant

Iris verna, the dwarf violet iris or upland dwarf iris, is a species of flowering plant in the iris family (Iridaceae). It is endemic to the eastern United States from Maryland to Florida along the Atlantic Coast, west to Mississippi, and inland to Kentucky, Tennessee, and Ohio. It occurs in nutrient-poor acidic soils of open to semi-shaded woodlands.

== Description ==
Iris verna is a small herbaceous, perennial flowering plant. It forms colonies through its deeply-buried underground rhizomes. It blooms in spring and generally has light to deep blue or violet inflorescence, although rare white forms are known. The sepals have a golden yellow signal.

It can be distinguished from the similar-looking Iris cristata, which occurs over much of its range, by a number of characters. Iris verna lacks the crested ridges that are found on the sepals of Iris cristata, and its flowers are strongly fragrant (Iris cristata is not strongly fragrant). In addition, the leaves of Iris verna are narrower and straighter than those of Iris cristata, and it has rhizomes that are deeply buried (as opposed to the shallow rhizomes of Iris cristata).

== Taxonomy ==
Two varieties are recognized:

- Iris verna var. verna – Native primarily to the Coastal Plain and extending into the Piedmont; with longer rhizomes and thus very loosely clump forming, and with narrower leaves.
- Iris verna var. smalliana – More widespread, although most common in mountainous areas; strongly clump forming, and with wider leaves.
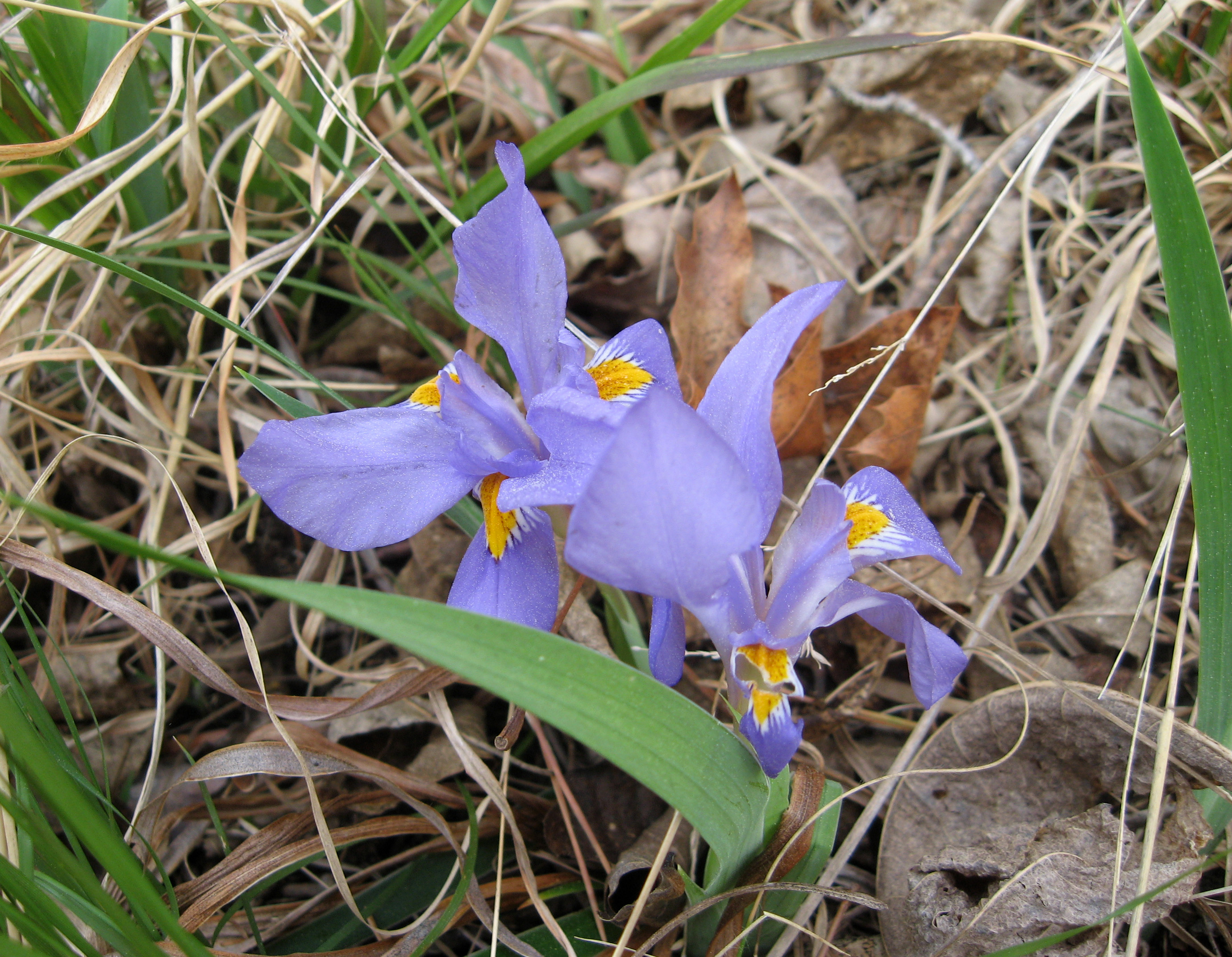
Variety smalliana is tightly clumped, with leaves 5–13 mm wide
