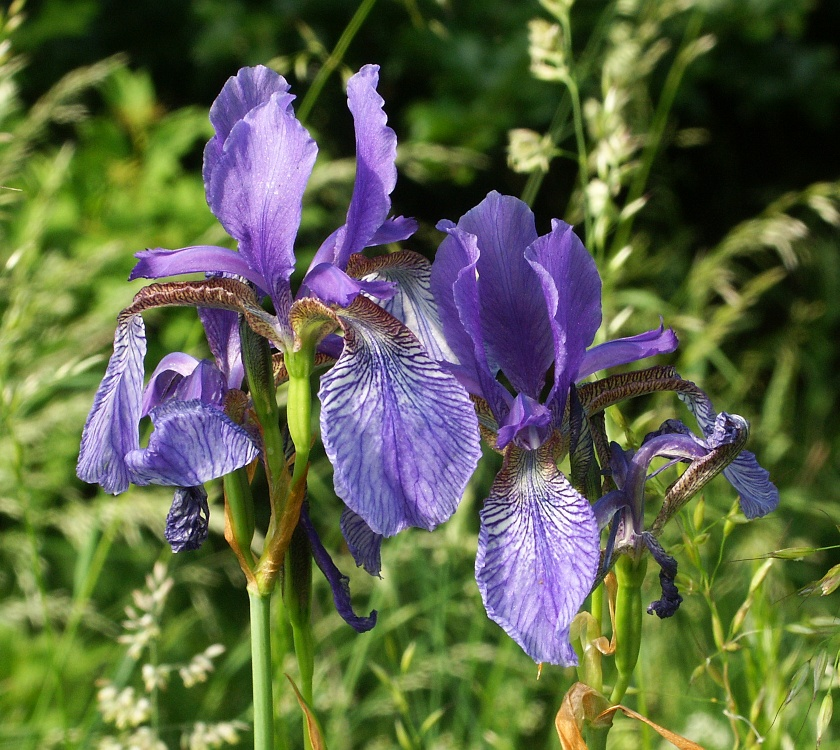
- Iris sibirica

Scientific classification
- Kingdom: Plantae
- Clade: Tracheophytes
- Clade: Angiosperms
- Clade: Monocots
- Order: Asparagales
- Family: Iridaceae
- Genus: Iris
- Subgenus: Iris subg. Limniris (Tausch) Spach

Series
- See text.

= Iris subg. Limniris =

Beardless iris

Subgenus of flowering plants

Subgenus Limniris is one subgenus of beardless irises, which don't have hairs on their drooping sepals, also called their falls.

'Limniris' is derived from the Latin for marsh or living-in-lakes iris, or pond iris. This refers to the fact that most species can be grown in moist habitats for part of the year.

It was originally described by Tausch in Deut. Bot. Herb.-Buch (Deutsche Botaniker) in 1841. Édouard Spach made changes 1846 in Ann. Sci. Nat., Bot. (Annales des Sciences Naturelles; Botanique).

It was divided into sections, 'Limniris', which is further divided down to about 16 series, and 'Lophiris' (also known as 'Evansias' or crested iris). They are both polyphyletic. It has 45 species, which are widely distributed in the Northern Hemisphere.

It is a group that has been recognized with few changes since Dykes's 1913 monograph on the genus Iris. Lawrence (1953), Rodionenko (1987) and then Mathew (1989) all tried to modify the group.

Various authors have tried to classify the list in various ways. It is still undergoing study and variations.

== Taxonomy ==
=== Section Limniris ===
(listed alphabetically)

Series Californicae Pacific Coast irises

- Iris bracteata – Siskiyou iris
- Iris chrysophylla – Yellow-leaved iris
- Iris douglasiana – Douglas iris
- Iris fernaldii – Fernald's iris
- Iris hartwegii – Hartweg's iris, rainbow iris, Sierra iris
- Iris innominata – Del Norte iris
- Iris macrosiphon – Bowltube iris
- Iris munzii – Munz's iris, Tulare lavender iris
- Iris purdyi – Purdy's iris
- Iris tenax – Tough-leaved iris, Oregon iris
- Iris tenuissima Dykes – (Long-tubed iris)

Series Chinenses (from east Asia)

- Iris henryi Baker
- Iris koreana Nakai
- Iris minutoaurea Makino
- Iris odaesanensis Y.N.Lee
- Iris proantha Diels
- Iris rossii Baker
- Iris speculatrix Hance

Series Ensatae

- Iris lactea Pall.

Series Foetidissimae

- Iris foetidissima L. – Stinking iris, Gladwin iris, stinking gladwin, gladdon, roast-beef plant

Series Hexagonae (known as the Louisiana irises)

- Iris brevicaulis Raf. – Zigzag iris
- Iris fulva Ker-Gawl. – Copper iris
- Iris giganticaerulea – Giant blue iris, giant blue flag
- Iris hexagona Walt. – Dixie iris
- Iris nelsonii Randolph – (Abbeville iris)
- Iris savannarum Small – Prairie iris

Series Laevigatae (which includes the Japanese irises)

- Iris ensata Thunb. – Japanese iris, hanashōbu (Japanese) (including I. kaempferi)
- Iris laevigata Fisch – Rabbitear iris, shallow-flowered iris, kakitsubata (Japanese)
- Iris maackii Maxim.
- Iris pseudacorus L. – Yellow iris, yellow flag
- Iris versicolor L. – Larger blue flag, harlequin blueflag
- Iris virginica L. – Virginia iris

Series Longipetalae (Rocky Mountain or long-petaled iris)

- Iris longipetala Herb. – (Coast iris)
- Iris missouriensis – Rocky Mountain iris, Western blue flag

Series Prismaticae (contains just one species from America)

- Iris prismatica Pursh ex Ker-Gawl. – (Slender blue flag)

Series Ruthenicae

- Iris ruthenica Ker-Gawl.
- Iris uniflora Pall.

Series Sibiricae (Siberian irises)

- Iris bulleyana Dykes
- Iris chrysographes – Black iris
- Iris clarkei Baker
- Iris delavayi Micheli
- Iris forrestii Dykes
- Iris sanguinea Hornem. ex Donn – Blood iris, ayame (Japanese)
- Iris sibirica – Siberian iris
- Iris typhifolia Kitag.
- Iris wilsonii C.H.Wright

Series Spuriae

- Iris brandzae Prod.
- Iris crocea Jacquem. ex R.C.Foster (including I. aurea)
- Iris graminea L.
- Iris halophila Pall.
  - Iris halophila var. sogdiana (Bunge) Grubov
- Iris kerneriana Asch. & Sint.
- Iris ludwigii Maxim.
- Iris notha M.Bieb.
- Iris orientalis Mill. – (Yellow-banded iris)
- Iris pontica Zapal.
- Iris pseudonotha Galushko
- Iris sintenisii Janka
- Iris spuria – Blue iris
  - Iris spuria subsp. carthaliniae (Fomin) B.Mathew
  - Iris spuria subsp. demetrii (Achv. & Mirzoeva) B.Mathew
  - Iris spuria subsp. maritima (Dykes) P.Fourn.
  - Iris spuria subsp. musulmanica (Fomin) Takht.
- Iris xanthospuria B.Mathew & T.Baytop

Series Syriacae (species with swollen leaf bases and spiney bristles)

- Iris grant-duffii Baker
- Iris masia Foster

Series Tenuifoliae (mostly semi-desert plants)

- Iris anguifuga Y.T.Zhao & X.J.Xue
- Iris bungei Maxim.
- Iris cathayensis Migo
- Iris farreri Dykes
- Iris kobayashii Kitag.
- Iris loczyi Kanitz
- Iris qinghainica Y.T.Zhao
- Iris songarica Schrenk
- Iris tenuifolia Pall.
- Iris ventricosa Pall.

Series Tripetalae (mostly having three petals)

- Iris hookeri Penny – (Hooker's iris)
- Iris setosa Pallas ex Link – (Beachhead iris)
- Iris tridentata Pursh – (Savanna iris)

Series Unguiculares

- Iris lazica Albov
- Iris unguicularis Poir.

Series Vernae (contains just one species from America)

- Iris verna L. – Dwarf violet iris

=== Section Lophiris ===
Otherwise known as 'Evansias' or crested iris.

- Iris confusa
- Iris cristata
- Iris formosana
- Iris japonica
- Iris lacustris
- Iris latistyla
- Iris milesii
- Iris subdichotoma
- Iris tectorum (Wall iris)
- Iris tenuis (Clackamas iris)
- Iris wattii

== Sources ==
- The Iris, by Brian Mathew, Batsford, 1989, 256 pages, 38 colour photos, 32 b/w photos, 16 illustrations, ISBN 0-7134-6039-3

== External list ==
- Clark University's classification of Iris

Data related to Iris sect. Limniris at Wikispecies
