= Philip Alexander Munz =

20th-century American botanist

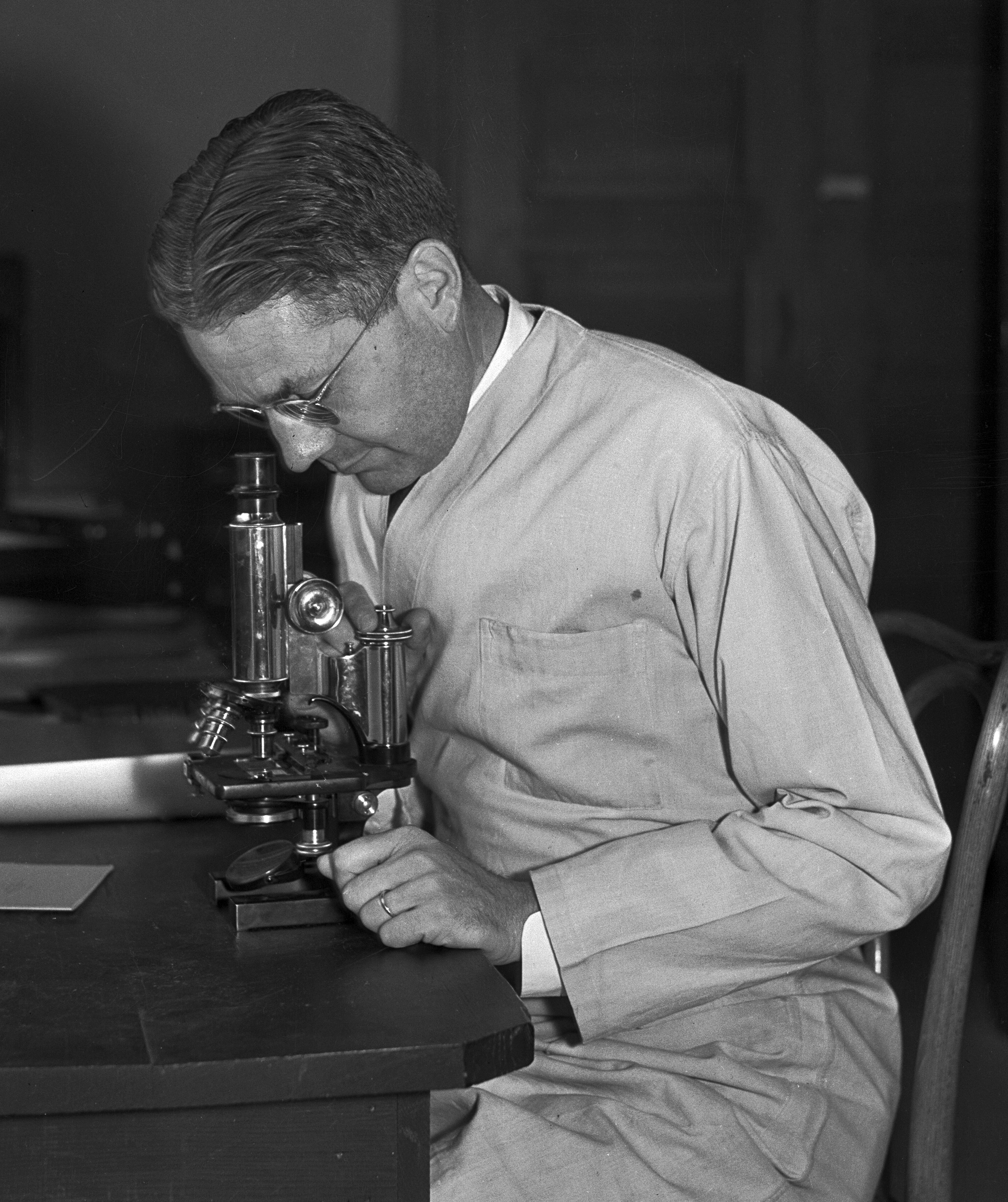
Munz in 1935

Philip Alexander Munz (1892–1974) was an American botanist, plant taxonomist and educator who worked at the Rancho Santa Ana Botanic Garden and was a professor of botany at Pomona College, serving as dean there for three years.

In 1935 Munz published his Manual of Southern California Botany. Munz compiled the voluminous A California Flora with David D. Keck, published by the University of California Press in 1959, and with a supplement published in 1968. Munz published A California Flora without any research support and with a relatively small subvention for publication from the University of California Press. In 1974, his book A Flora of Southern California was published posthumously, with the botanical families presented in an alphabetical order.

== List of selected publications ==
Munz authored four popular plant guides for general readers interested in botany but untrained in plant taxonomy, published by the University of California Press, and referred to as the California Wildflower Books:

- Munz, Philip Alexander (1961). California Spring Wildflowers. University of California Press. ISBN 9780520008960.
- Munz, Philip Alexander (1962). California Desert Wildflowers. University of California Press. ISBN 9780520008991.
- Munz, Philip Alexander (1963). California Mountain Wildflowers. University of California Press. ISBN 9780520009011.
- Munz, Philip Alexander (1964). Shore Wildflowers of California, Oregon and Washington. University of California Press.
- Munz, Philip Alexander (1935). A Manual of Southern California Botany. J.W. Stacey.
- Munz, Philip Alexander; Keck, David D. (1959). A California Flora. University of California Press. ISBN 0-520-02405-2.
- Munz, Philip Alexander; Keck, David D. (1968). A California Flora - Supplement. University of California Press.
- Munz, Philip Alexander (1974). A Flora of Southern California. University of California Press. ISBN 978-0520021464.
- Munz, Philip Alexander (March 2004). Introduction to California Desert Wildflowers (Volume 74) (California Natural History Guides) First Edition, Revised. University of California Press. ISBN 9780520236325.

== Honours ==
Several plants have been named after him including; Salvia munzii Epling, Cereus munzii Parish (= Echinocereus munzii (Parish) L.D. Benson), Iris munzii R.C. Foster, Layia munzii D.D. Keck, Opuntia munzii C.B. Wolf and the genus Munzothamnus P.H. Raven. (Asteraceae).
