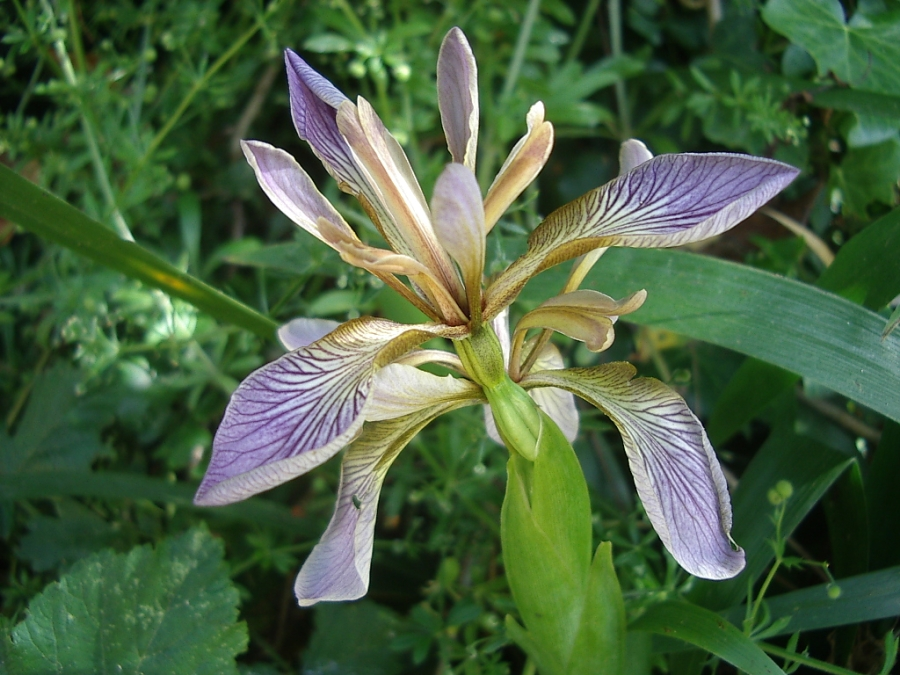
- Flower

Scientific classification
- Kingdom: Plantae
- Clade: Tracheophytes
- Clade: Angiosperms
- Clade: Monocots
- Order: Asparagales
- Family: Iridaceae
- Genus: Iris
- Subgenus: Iris subg. Limniris
- Section: Iris sect. Limniris
- Series: Iris ser. Foetidissimae
- Species: I. foetidissima

Binomial name
- Iris foetidissima L.

= Iris foetidissima =

Species of flowering plant in the iris family

Iris foetidissima, the stinking iris, gladdon, Gladwin iris, roast-beef plant, or stinking gladwin, is a species of flowering plant in the family Iridaceae, found in open woodland, hedgebanks and on sea-cliffs.

Its natural range is Western Europe, including England (south of Durham) and also Ireland, and from France south and east to N. Africa, Italy and Greece.

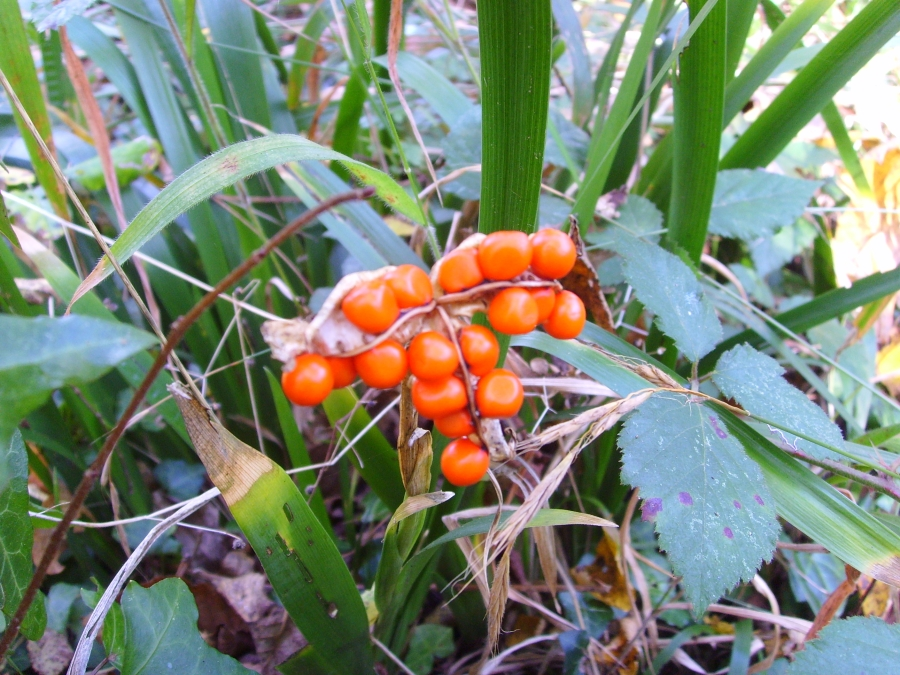
Seeds

It is one of two iris species native to Britain, the other being the yellow iris (Iris pseudacorus).

It has tufts of dark green leaves. Its flowers are usually of a dull, leaden-blue colour, or dull buff-yellow tinged with blue. The petals have delicate veining. It blooms between June and July, but the flowers only last a day or so. The green seed capsules, which remain attached to the plant throughout the winter, are 5–8 cm (2–3 in) long; and the seeds are scarlet.

It is known as "stinking" because some people find the smell of its leaves unpleasant when crushed or bruised, an odour that has been described as "beefy". Its common names of 'gladdon' and 'gladwyn' or 'gladwin', are in reference to an old word for a sword (Latin gladius) due to the shape of the iris's leaves.

This plant is cultivated in gardens in the temperate zones. Both the species and its cultivar 'Variegata' have gained the Royal Horticultural Society's Award of Garden Merit.
