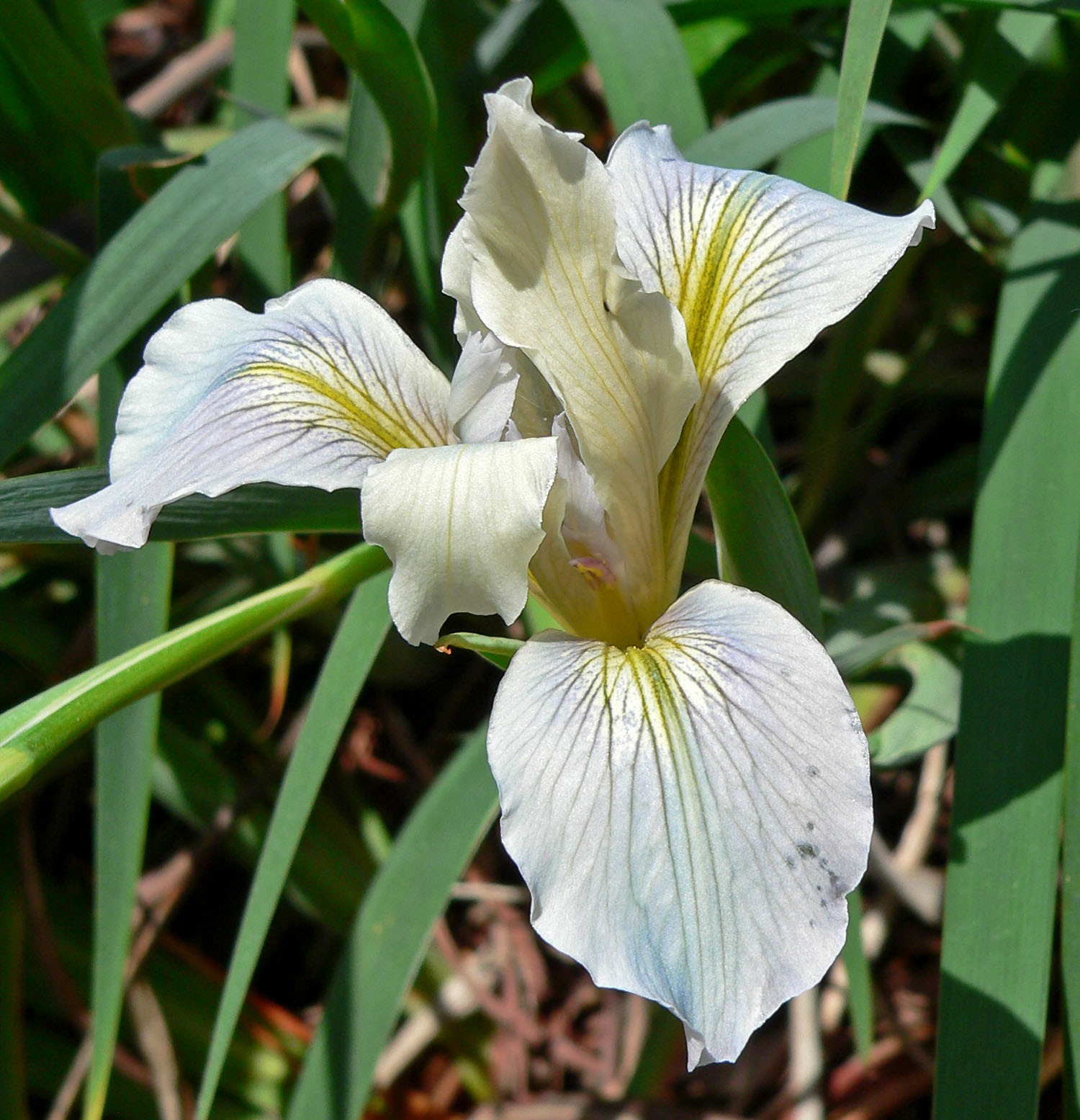

Scientific classification
- Kingdom: Plantae
- Clade: Tracheophytes
- Clade: Angiosperms
- Clade: Monocots
- Order: Asparagales
- Family: Iridaceae
- Genus: Iris
- Subgenus: Iris subg. Limniris
- Section: Iris sect. Limniris
- Series: Iris ser. Californicae
- Species: I. fernaldii

Binomial name
- Iris fernaldii R.C.Foster

Synonyms
- Limniris fernaldii (R.C.Foster) Rodion.

= Iris fernaldii =

Species of flowering plant

Iris fernaldii, commonly known as Fernald's iris, is a species of iris endemic to western Northern California. It is native to the Inner and Outer North California Coast Ranges, such as the Santa Cruz Mountains, and surrounding the San Francisco Bay Area. It is found between 164–6,562 feet (50–2,000 m) in elevation. It grows in full sun near the coast, and afternoon shade inland.

Fernald's are no longer found in pure form in Marin County, however; they have naturally hybridized with Iris douglasiana in this area.

== Description ==
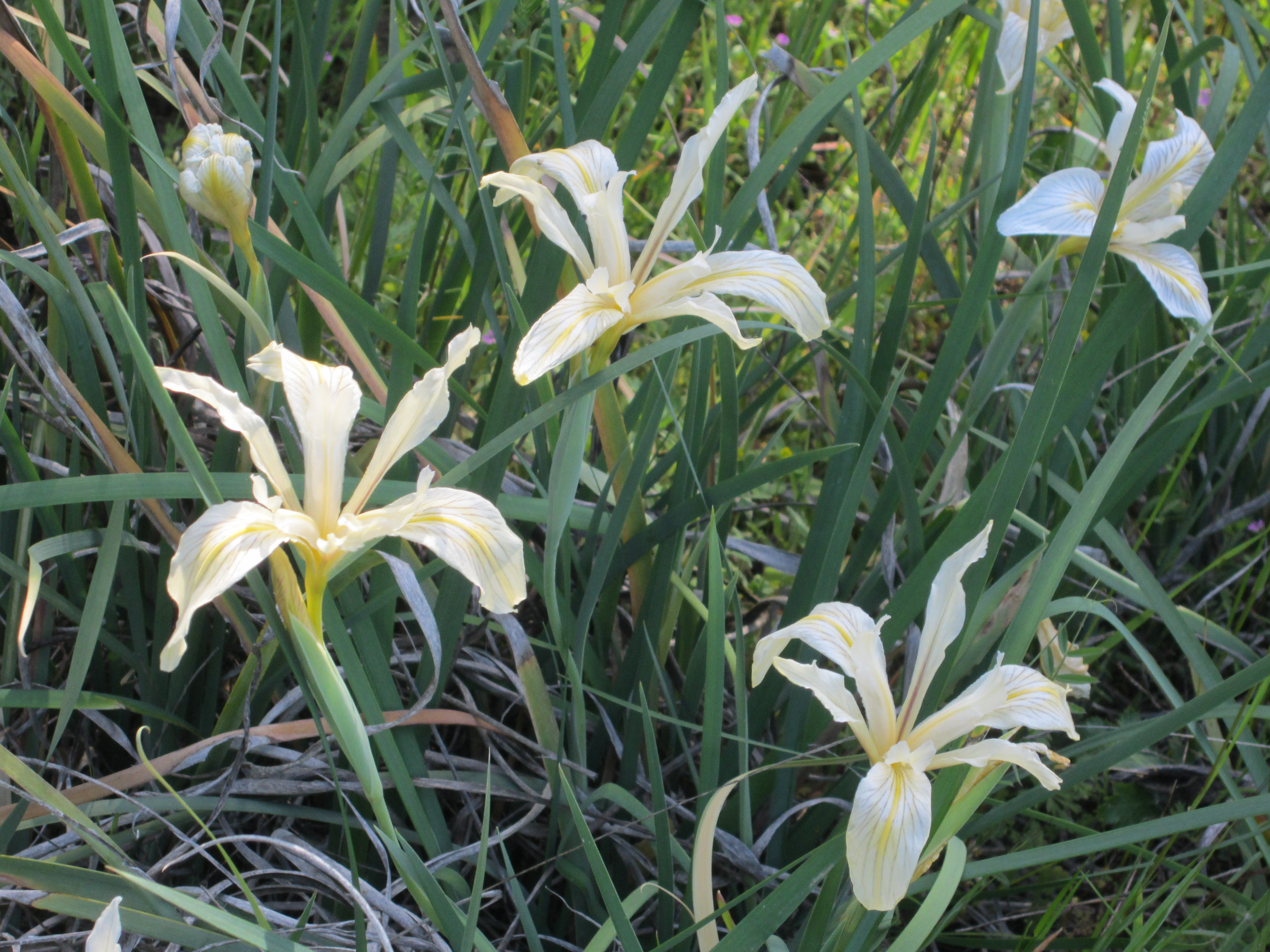
'Clump' of Iris fernaldii (Fernald's iris) plants.

Iris fernaldii spreads by underground rhizomes. It has leaves that are gray-green with pink, red, or purple coloring along their edges and bases. The plants grow to 1 foot (30 cm) tall

The gray-veined yellow flowers usually grow paired on a stem. The color ranges from creamy white or a rich to pale yellow, and rarely light lavender.

== Cultivation ==
Iris fernaldii is cultivated as an ornamental plant by specialty plant nurseries. It is used in traditional flower beds, native plant and habitat gardens, drought tolerant and natural landscaping, and for habitat restoration projects. Occasional summer irrigation is needed in warmer climates.

== See also ==
- List of California native plants
- Endemic flora of California
