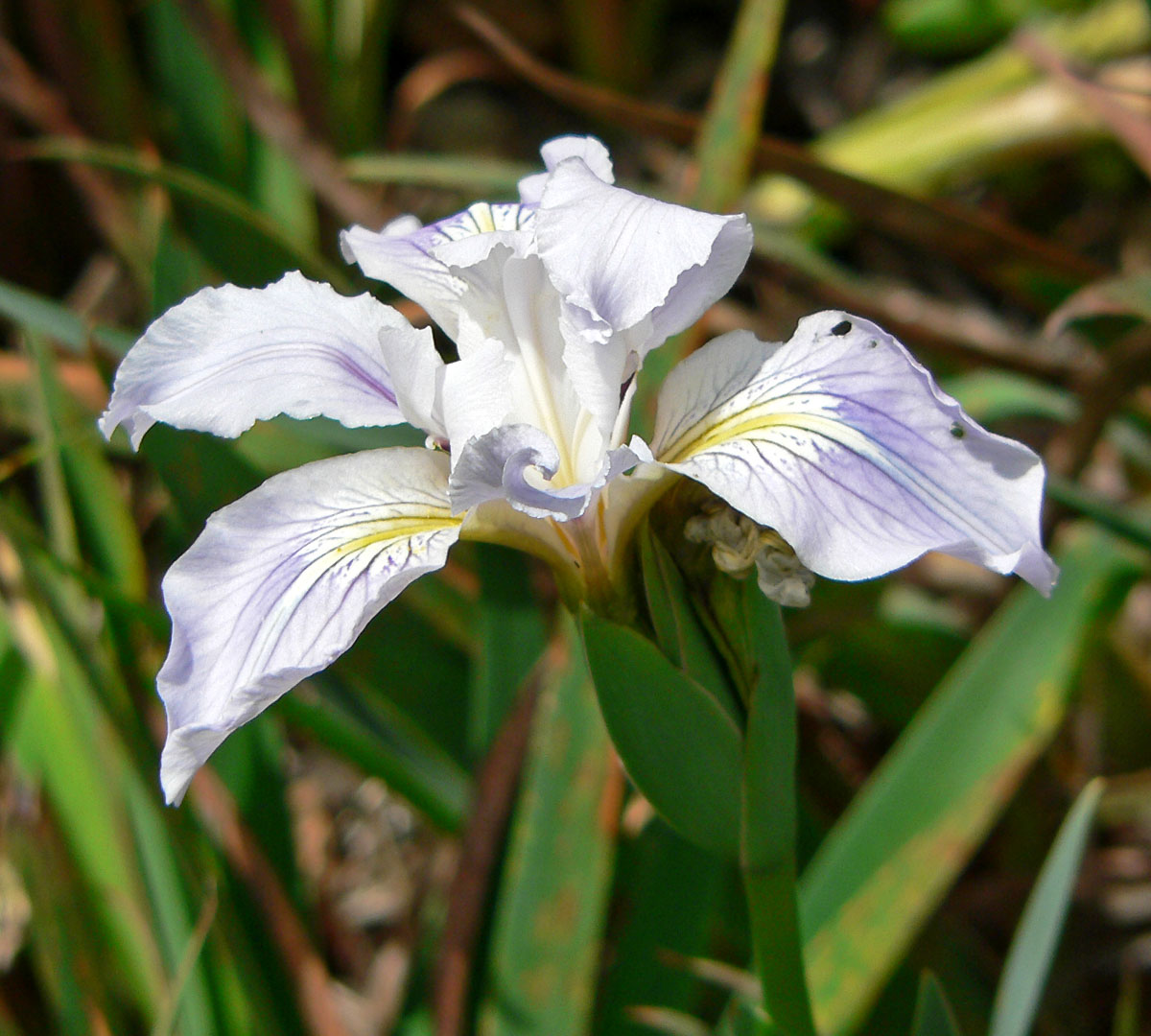

Conservation status
- Imperiled (NatureServe)

Scientific classification
- Kingdom: Plantae
- Clade: Tracheophytes
- Clade: Angiosperms
- Clade: Monocots
- Order: Asparagales
- Family: Iridaceae
- Genus: Iris
- Subgenus: Iris subg. Limniris
- Section: Iris sect. Limniris
- Series: Iris ser. Californicae
- Species: I. munzii

Binomial name
- Iris munzii R.C.Foster

Synonyms
- Limniris munzii (R.C.Foster) Rodion.

= Iris munzii =

Species of flowering plant

Iris munzii is a species of iris which is endemic to the Sierra Nevada foothills of Tulare County, California, mostly in the vicinity of the Tule River. It is quite rare in the wild. Its common names include Tulare lavender iris and Munz's iris. Its flowers grow in inflorescences of three to four per stem, and are usually lighter shades of purple and blue with darker veining. Albinos are known.

== Taxonomy ==
It was first published and described by Robert Crichton Foster in his book 'Iridis Species Novae' (published in Cambridge, Massachusetts) on page 2 in 1938.

The Latin specific epithet munzii is in honour of the American botanist Philip A. Munz.

Iris munzii is a tentatively accepted name by the Royal Horticultural Society in the UK, and was last listed in the RHS Plant Finder in 2000. It was verified by United States Department of Agriculture and the Agricultural Research Service on 4 April 2003.

== Distribution and habitat ==
It is native to the temperate region of Northern America.

=== Range ===
It is found in California.

=== Habitat ===
It is found growing on dry to moist partially wooded slopes and rarely along stream banks. At elevations of 305 to 800 m (1,001 to 2,625 ft) above sea level.

== Other sources ==
- FNA Editorial Committee. 1993-. Flora of North America. URL: http://floranorthamerica.org/Main_Page
- Hickman, J. C., ed. 1993. The Jepson manual: higher plants of California
- Mathew, B. 1981. The Iris. 98.
