= Carl Purdy =

American horticulturalist

- Born: 1861
- Died: August 8 1945 (aged 83–84)
- Scientific career
- Fields: Horticulture

Carl Purdy (1861 – August 8, 1945) was an American nurseryman from Ukiah, California.

== Early life ==
Purdy was born in the Midwest and moved to Ukiah, California, as a child. He was accepted to the United States Military Academy, but could not attend after an accident damaged his vision. Purdy became interested in botany and biology as a child and later worked as a schoolteacher.

== Career ==
As a nurseryman, Purdy specialized in plants native to California. Iris purdyi (Purdy's iris), which he discovered, is named after him. The San Francisco Call ran an article about him "The Lily Man of Ukiah." His nursery business, Carl Purdy Gardens, was continued by his children.

A collection of catalogues issued by his firm is held at the Bailey Hortorium on the campus of Cornell University. The New York Botanic Garden has a biography of Carl Purdy.
