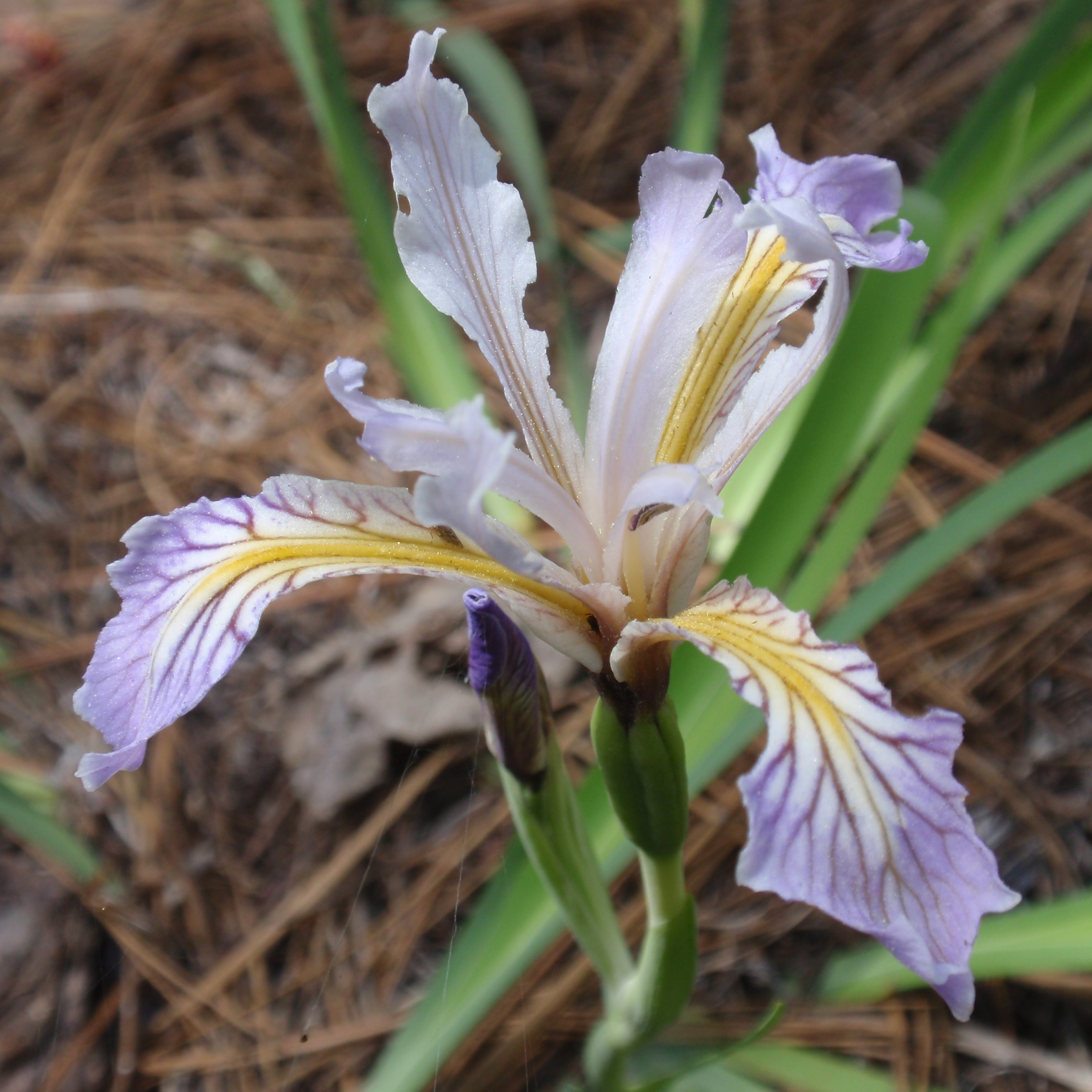

Conservation status
- Apparently Secure (NatureServe)

Scientific classification
- Kingdom: Plantae
- Clade: Tracheophytes
- Clade: Angiosperms
- Clade: Monocots
- Order: Asparagales
- Family: Iridaceae
- Genus: Iris
- Subgenus: Iris subg. Limniris
- Section: Iris sect. Limniris
- Series: Iris ser. Californicae
- Species: I. hartwegii

Binomial name
- Iris hartwegii Baker

Synonyms
- Iris hartwegii subsp. australis (Parish) L.W.Lenz; Iris hartwegii var. australis Parish; Iris hartwegii subsp. columbiana L.W.Lenz; Iris hartwegii subsp. hartwegii (no author known); Iris hartwegii subsp. pinetorum (Eastw.) L.W.Lenz; Iris pinetorum Eastw.; Iris tenax var. australis (Parish) R.C.Foster; Limniris hartwegii (Baker) Rodion.

= Iris hartwegii =

Species of flowering plant

Iris hartwegii is a species of iris endemic to California, where it can be found on low-elevation mountain slopes in the central counties. It has many common names including; foothill iris, rainbow iris, Sierra iris, and Hartweg's iris.

It bears one to three flowers on a slender stem, and the flowers may be shades of purple or yellow to almost white. It has lavender veining. There were three to five subspecies, but these are now considered synonyms.
