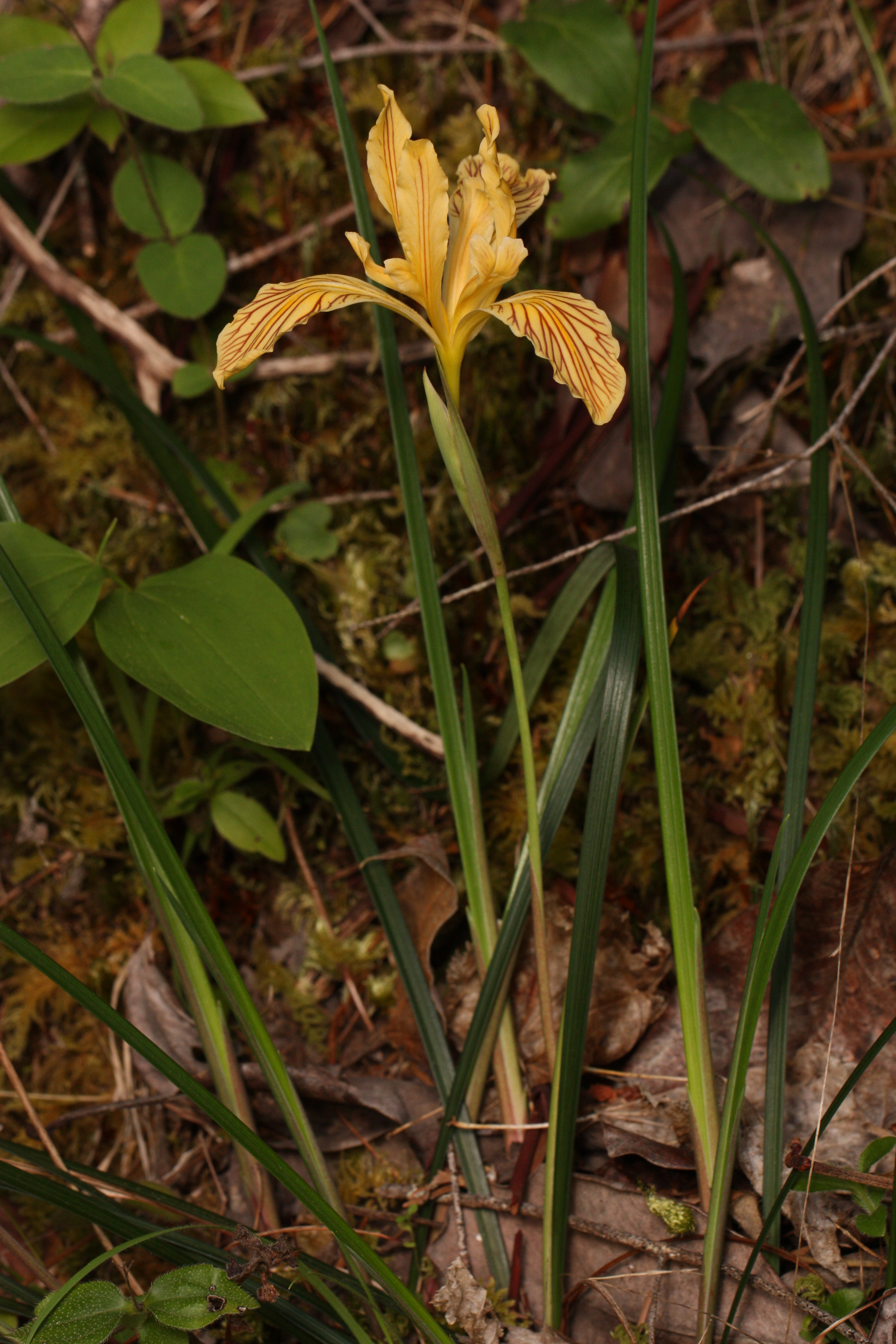

Scientific classification
- Kingdom: Plantae
- Clade: Tracheophytes
- Clade: Angiosperms
- Clade: Monocots
- Order: Asparagales
- Family: Iridaceae
- Genus: Iris
- Subgenus: Iris subg. Limniris
- Section: Iris sect. Limniris
- Series: Iris ser. Californicae
- Species: I. innominata

Binomial name
- Iris innominata L.F.Henderson

Synonyms
- Iris tenax subsp. innominata (L.F.Hend.) Q.D.Clarkson; Limniris innominata (L.F.Hend.) Rodion.

= Iris innominata =

Species of flowering plant

Iris innominata, the Del Norte County iris, is a species of iris native to southern Oregon, and California along the north coast and Klamath Ranges in Del Norte County, California.

The leaves are dense and evergreen, up to 20 cm. The flower is typically deep golden yellow with darker veins, although colors may vary. The flower stems are about 12 cm and usually bear 1–2 flowers in spring.

It is on the California Native Plant Society Inventory of Rare and Endangered Plants of California List 4, Limited distribution (Watch List).

== Cultivation ==
Iris innominata, used in gardens, does best in locations with cool, wet winters and warm, dry summers, in neutral or slightly acidic soil, with good drainage, and sun or partial shade.

It is often used for hybridizing with other Iris species. Many plants sold under this name in nurseries are hybrids.
