= Iris subdichotoma =

Scientific classification
- Kingdom: Plantae
- Clade: Tracheophytes
- Clade: Angiosperms
- Clade: Monocots
- Order: Asparagales
- Family: Iridaceae
- Genus: Iris
- Subgenus: Iris subg. Limniris
- Section: Iris sect. Lophiris
- Species: I. subdichotoma

Binomial name
- Iris subdichotoma Y. T. Zhao

Synonyms
- Iris subdichotoma f. alba .G.Shen & Y.T.Zhao

Species of flowering plant

Iris subdichotoma is a plant species in the genus Iris, it is also in the subgenus Limniris and in the section Lophiris (crested irises). It is a rhizomatous perennial, from Tibet and China, with pale blue, blue-purple, purple, violet or white flowers. It is cultivated as an ornamental plant in temperate regions.

== Description ==
It has short rhizome with a few branches. Below is thick roots. On top of the rhizomes are the brown, fibrous remains of last seasons leaves, surrounding the new leaves.

It has grey-green, sword-shaped and slightly curved leaves. They grow up to 22–40 cm (9–16 in) long and 1–2 cm wide. They do not have any mid-veins. The leaves are generally short than the flower stems.

It has flowering stems that can grow up to 25–40 cm (10–16 in) long. The stems have between two and five branches.

The plant is very similar in form to Iris dichotoma but only smaller.

The stems have 3–5 green, spathes (leaves of the flower bud), which have membranous margins. They are 2.5–3.5 cm (1–1 in) long and 7–8 mm wide. The bracts are similar in size to Iris dichotoma.

The stems (and branches) hold between two and four flowers, between June and August. But normally in June.

Leading from the spathes are stiff, pedicels (or peduncles), that are between 3 and 4 cm (1 and 2 in) long.

The flowers are 4.5–5 cm (2–2 in) in diameter, and come in shades of pale blue, blue-purple, purple, or violet. Later, a white flowering form was found and then was published and named as Iris subdichotoma f. alba Y. G. Shen, in 'Acta Bot. Yunnan' Vol.26 Issue5 page492 in 2004). Although this is now classified as a synonym of Iris subdichotoma.

It has three pairs of petals, three large sepals (outer petals), known as the 'falls' and three inner, smaller petals (or tepals, known as the 'standards'. The falls are oblanceolate, and 4 cm long and 7 cm (3 in) long. The falls have a central yellow crest. The standards are narrow and oblanceolate, and 3 cm long and 4 mm wide.

It has a 2 cm long perianth tube, 2.2 cm long stamens, 1.5 long and 0.5 cm wide, fusiform (spindle-shaped) ovary and 3 cm long style branches. The styles branches have narrowly triangular lobes. It also has filaments that are longer than the anthers.

After the iris has flowered, it produces a cylindric seed capsule, between July and September, that is 5–6 cm (2–2 in) long and 1 cm wide. It has six longitudinal ribs. The capsule when ripe, splits a third of the way down, releasing the seeds. The seeds are 7.5–8.5 mm wide, maroon-brown and have a small wings.

=== Genetics ===
In 2006, 13 species of Iris, including Iris subdichotoma, Iris delavayi and Iris cuniculiformis were studied for a cytological analysis of the chromosome counts.

In 2007, the chromosomes of Iris dichotoma, Iris domestica (Belamcanda chinensis) and Iris subdichotoma were also studied.

As most irises are diploid, having two sets of chromosomes, this can be used to identify hybrids and classification of groupings. Iris subdichotoma has a count of 2n=42.

== Taxonomy ==
It has the common name of 'Zhongdian iris'. Note; 'Zhongdian' is an older name for Shangri-La City. It is written as 中甸鸢尾 in Chinese script and known as zhong dian yuan wei in Pidgin Chinese.

The Latin specific epithet subdichotoma refers to Iris dichotoma (Also known as the Vesper Iris). 'Dichotoma' means forked in pairs or having 2 branches. It is very similar in form to Iris dichotoma but smaller.

It was first published and described by Yu Tang Zhao in 'Acta Phytotaxonomica Sinica' (Acta Phytotax. Sin. published in Beijing) Vol.18 Issue 1 on page 57 in 1980.

It was verified by United States Department of Agriculture Agricultural Research Service on 4 April 2003 and then updated on 29 September 2008. Iris subdichotoma is an accepted name by the RHS.

== Distribution and habitat ==
It is native to temperate regions of Asia.

=== Range ===
It has been found in Chinese province of Yunnan, in China.

It has been found on Haba Snow Mountain, and beside the Yangtze River.

=== Habitat ===
It grows in grasslands, on open hillsides or on banks or slopes beside rivers.

It grows at altitudes of between 1,800 and 2,700 m (5,900 and 8,900 ft) above sea level.

== Sources ==
- Mathew, B. 1981. The Iris. 205.
- Waddick, J. W. & Zhao Yu-tang. 1992. Iris of China.
