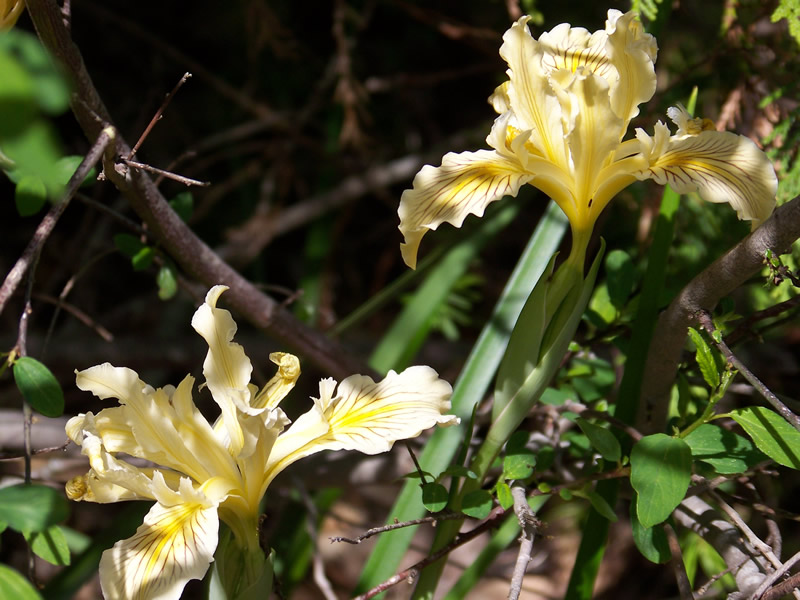

Conservation status
- Apparently Secure (NatureServe)

Scientific classification
- Kingdom: Plantae
- Clade: Tracheophytes
- Clade: Angiosperms
- Clade: Monocots
- Order: Asparagales
- Family: Iridaceae
- Genus: Iris
- Subgenus: Iris subg. Limniris
- Section: Iris sect. Limniris
- Series: Iris ser. Californicae
- Species: I. bracteata

Binomial name
- Iris bracteata S.Wats.

= Iris bracteata =

Species of flowering plant

Iris bracteata, whose common name is Siskiyou iris, is a species of iris.

It is endemic to the Klamath Mountains, in Del Norte County, California, and Curry County, Josephine County, and Jackson County, Oregon, in the United States.

Its flowers grow singly or paired on a stem, and are usually cream-colored or yellowish with purple or brown veining.
