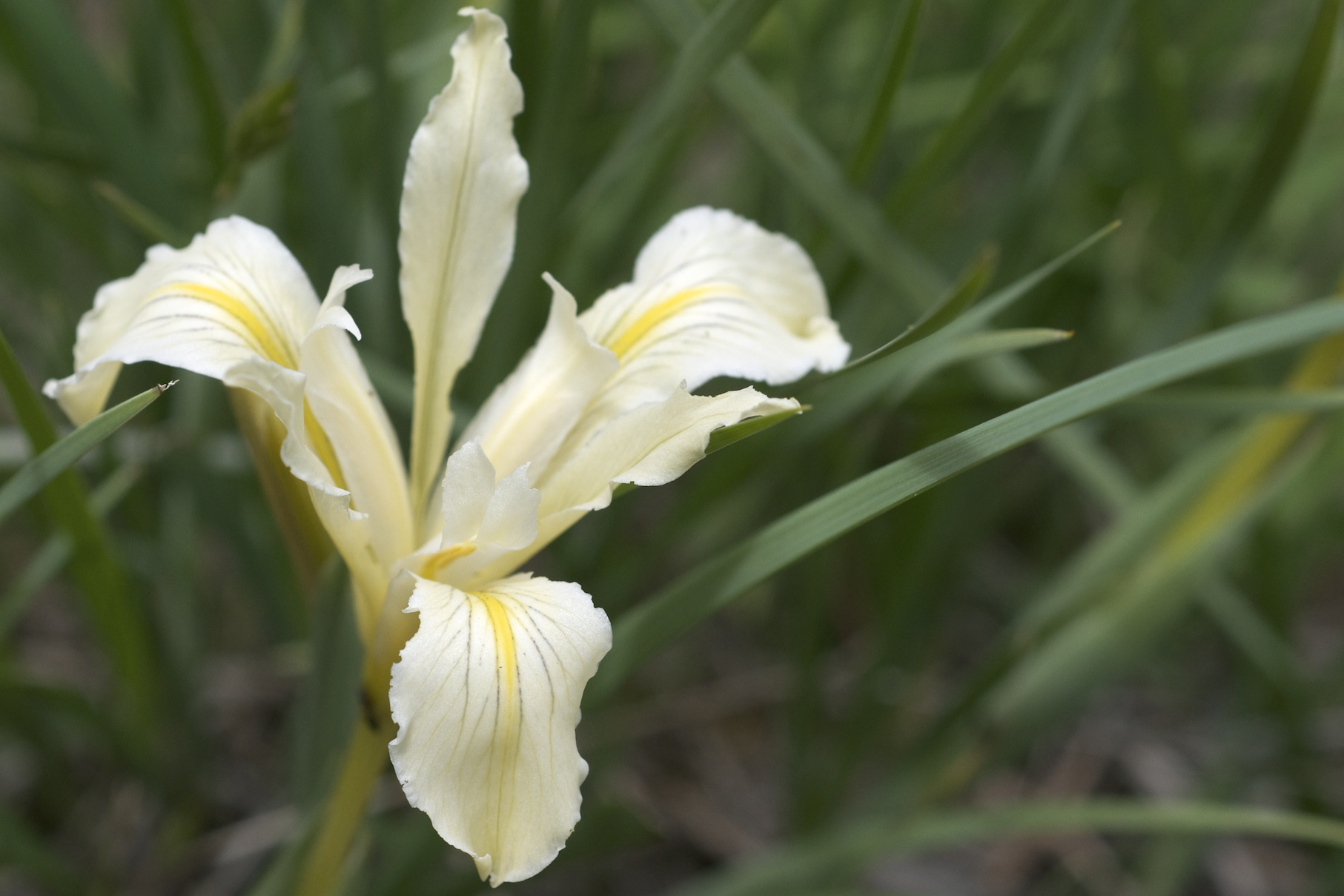
- Bowltube Iris

Scientific classification
- Kingdom: Plantae
- Clade: Tracheophytes
- Clade: Angiosperms
- Clade: Monocots
- Order: Asparagales
- Family: Iridaceae
- Genus: Iris
- Subgenus: Iris subg. Limniris
- Section: Iris sect. Limniris
- Series: Iris ser. Californicae
- Species: I. macrosiphon

Binomial name
- Iris macrosiphon Torr.

= Iris macrosiphon =

Species of flowering plant

Iris macrosiphon, the bowltube iris, is a flowering plant in the iris family, endemic to California in the Cascade Range Foothills, north and central Sierra Nevada Foothills, Inner North Coast Ranges, and San Francisco Bay Area, where it occurs in sunny grasslands, meadows, and open woodlands.

The leaves are very slender, 2.5–5 mm wide, and blue-green in color. The flower is variable, golden yellow to cream or pale lavender to deep blue-purple, generally with darker veins. The flower stems are usually short (less than 25 cm) when in the sun and bear 2 flowers. It blooms in spring.

== Uses ==
Used as a source of fiber by Native Americans. The fiber was used for fish nets, deer snares and other items.

It is also cultivated as an ornamental plant, where it prefers dry summer dormancy, with good drainage.
