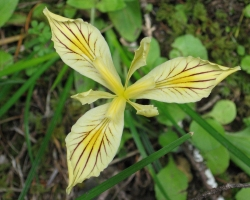
- Iris chrysophylla

Scientific classification
- Kingdom: Plantae
- Clade: Tracheophytes
- Clade: Angiosperms
- Clade: Monocots
- Order: Asparagales
- Family: Iridaceae
- Genus: Iris
- Subgenus: Iris subg. Limniris
- Section: Iris sect. Limniris
- Series: Iris ser. Californicae (Diels) Lawrence

= Iris ser. Californicae =

Group of flowering plants

Iris series Californicae are a series of the genus Iris, in Iris subg. Limniris. They are commonly known as Pacific Coast iris (PCI), or Pacific Coast natives (PCN).

The series was first classified by Diels in Die Natürlichen Pflanzenfamilien (Edited by H. G. A. Engler and K. Prantl) in 1930. It was further expanded by Lawrence in 'Gentes Herb' (written in Dutch) in 1953.

They all possess thin wiry, rhizomes and roots. They also have narrow, long evergreen leaves. Which are leathery and deep green.

The plants have unbranched flower stems that bear 2 or 3 flowers. The plants do clump quickly and produce many stems. They prefer acid soils. (all except 'Iris douglasiana', which prefers alkaline soils). In the wild, all the species are located on soils on slopes with good drainage. They grow at the edge of woods. They do not like root disturbance, so can be difficult to cultivate for the gardener. They can be grown in large clay pots in the UK, to be able to protect them in the winter. or they could be grown from seed, to stop root disturbance. Most flower between mid spring to early summer. April to June (in the UK). The leaves can turn red in the autumn. They have been used to create various hybrids, mostly in America.

They come from the west coast of USA, native to California, Oregon, and Washington. They are mostly dwarf in size and flower in early summer. They vary in colour depending on the species.

It includes;

Image	Scientific name	Distribution
	Iris bracteata S.Watson – Siskiyou iris	California (Del Norte County), Oregon (Curry County, Josephine County, and Jackson County)
	Iris chrysophylla Howell – yellow-leaved iris	northern California, southern Oregon
	Iris douglasiana Herb. – Douglas iris	Northern and Central California and southern Oregon
	Iris fernaldii R.C.Foster – Fernald's iris	Santa Cruz Mountains, and surrounding the San Francisco Bay Area.
	Iris hartwegii Baker – Hartweg's iris, rainbow iris, Sierra iris	California
	Iris innominata L.F.Hend. – Del Norte iris	southern Oregon, and California
	Iris macrosiphon Torr. – bowltube iris	Sierra Nevada Foothills, Inner North Coast Ranges, and San Francisco Bay Area
	Iris munzii R.C.Foster – Munz's iris, Tulare lavender iris	Sierra Nevada Foothills, Inner North Coast Ranges, and San Francisco Bay Area
	Iris purdyi Eastw. – Purdy's iris	California and into southern Oregon
	Iris tenax Douglas ex Lindl. – tough-leaved iris, Oregon iris	southwestern Washington, western Oregon, and northwestern California.
	Iris tenuissima Dykes – (long-tubed iris)	California
