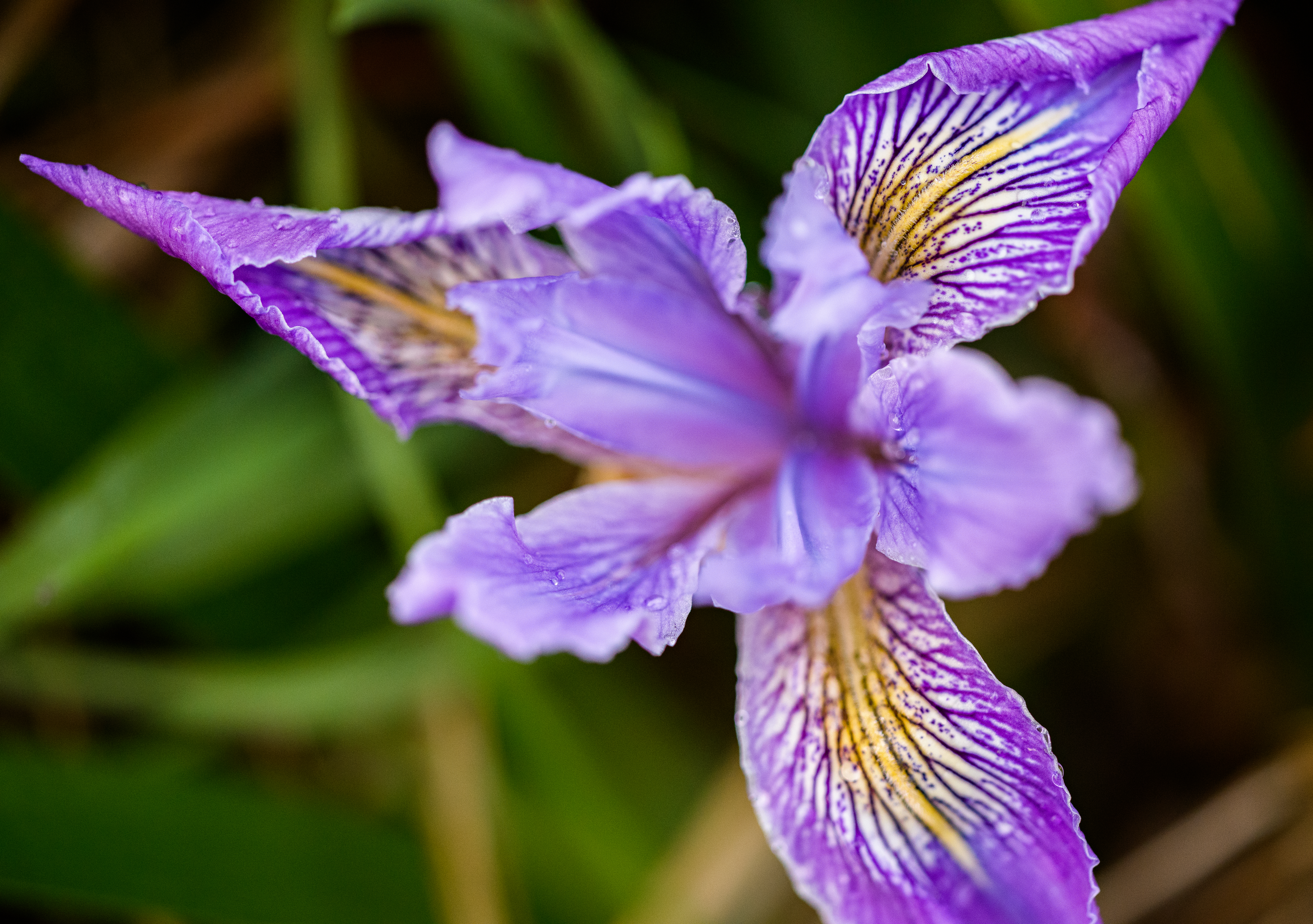

Scientific classification
- Kingdom: Plantae
- Clade: Tracheophytes
- Clade: Angiosperms
- Clade: Monocots
- Order: Asparagales
- Family: Iridaceae
- Genus: Iris
- Subgenus: Iris subg. Limniris
- Section: Iris sect. Limniris
- Series: Iris ser. Californicae
- Species: I. tenax

Binomial name
- Iris tenax Dougl. ex Lindl.

= Iris tenax =

Species of flowering plant

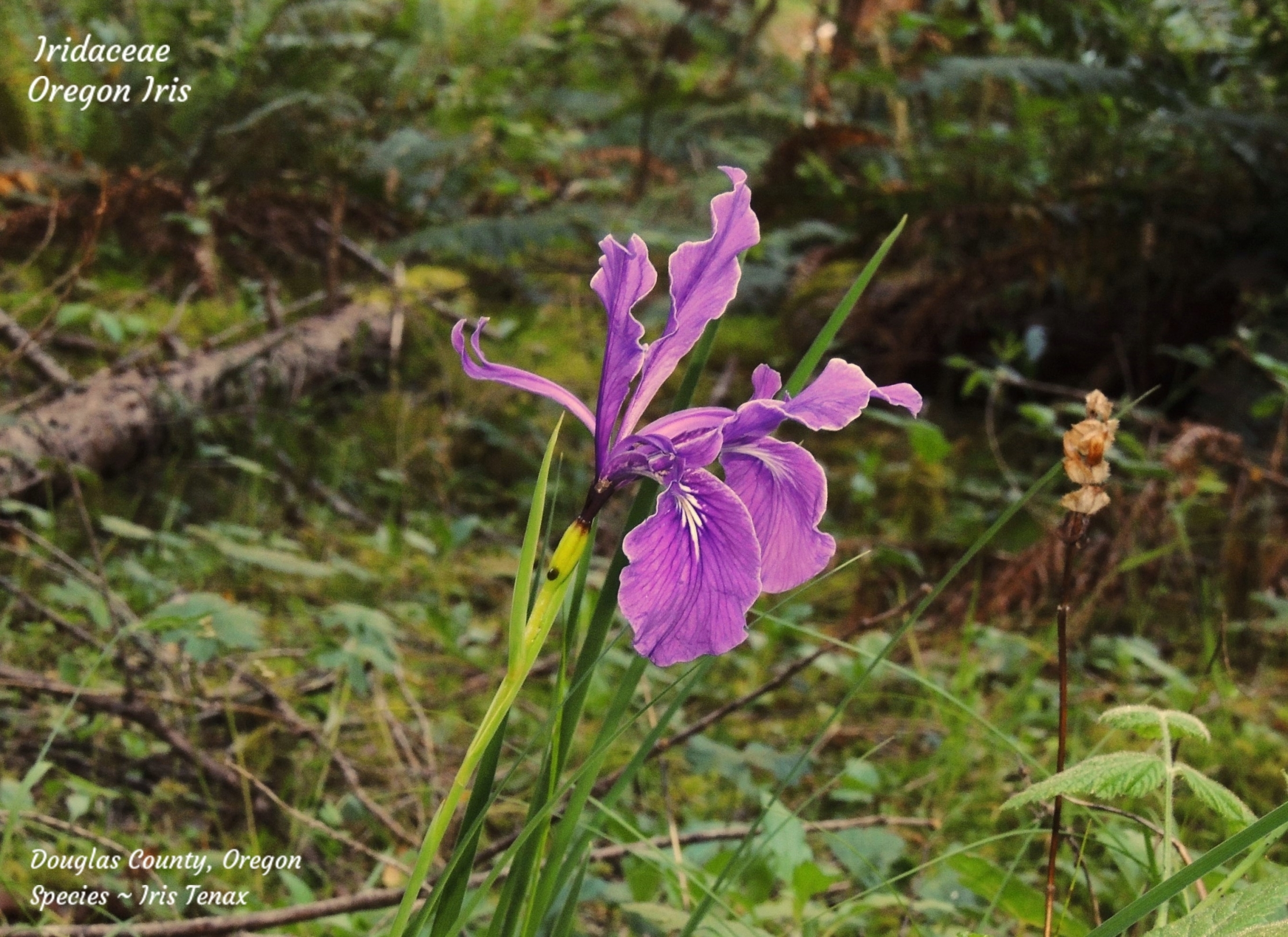
Iris tenax growing in the chaparral and riparian of Engels Creek near Thunder Mountain Rd. Glide, Oregon, Douglas County

Iris tenax is a species of Iris, known by the common names tough-leaved iris, Oregon iris, or more colloquially, flag.

== Distribution ==
It is native to southwestern Washington, western Oregon, and northwestern California. It occurs along roadsides and in grasslands and forest openings at low to middle elevations. The subspecies Iris tenax ssp. klamathensis is endemic to northern California in the Klamath Mountains.

== Description ==
Like many irises, Iris tenax has large and showy flowers. The flowers bloom in mid to late spring and are usually lavender-blue to purple, but blooms in white, yellow, pink, and orchid shades are known to sometimes occur.

The leaves are very slender for an iris, seldom over 5 mm broad; the plant is often mistaken for a type of grass when not in bloom. Its rhizomes spread slowly, causing the plant to grow in a tight clump.

Its species name (tenax) means "tough" or "tenacious" and is in reference to the strong, fibrous leaves of the plant, which were used by indigenous peoples for braiding into snares and other cordage.
