= List of Iris species =

== Subgenus Iris ==
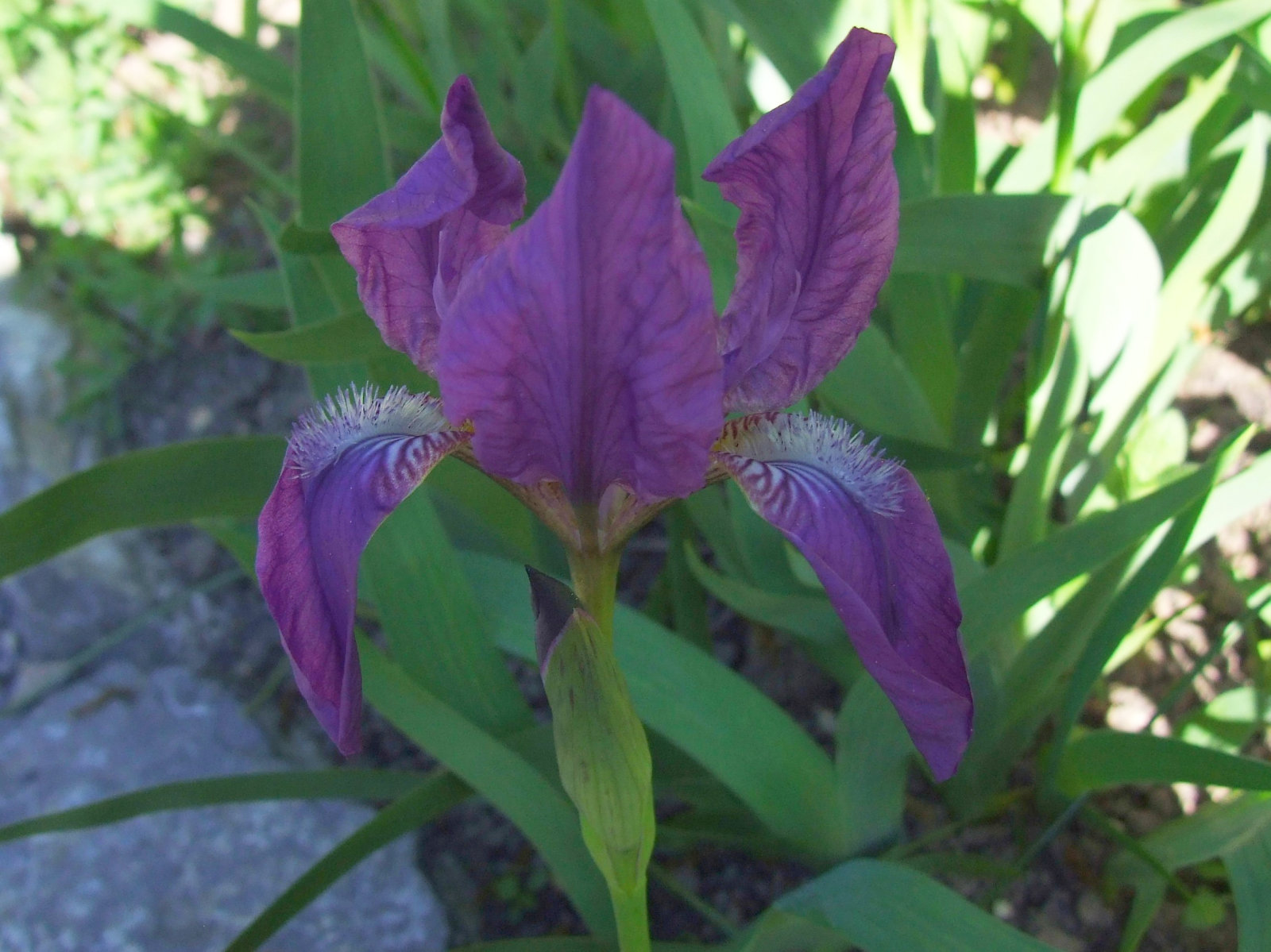
Stool iris (Iris aphylla) flower. Note prominent white "beard".

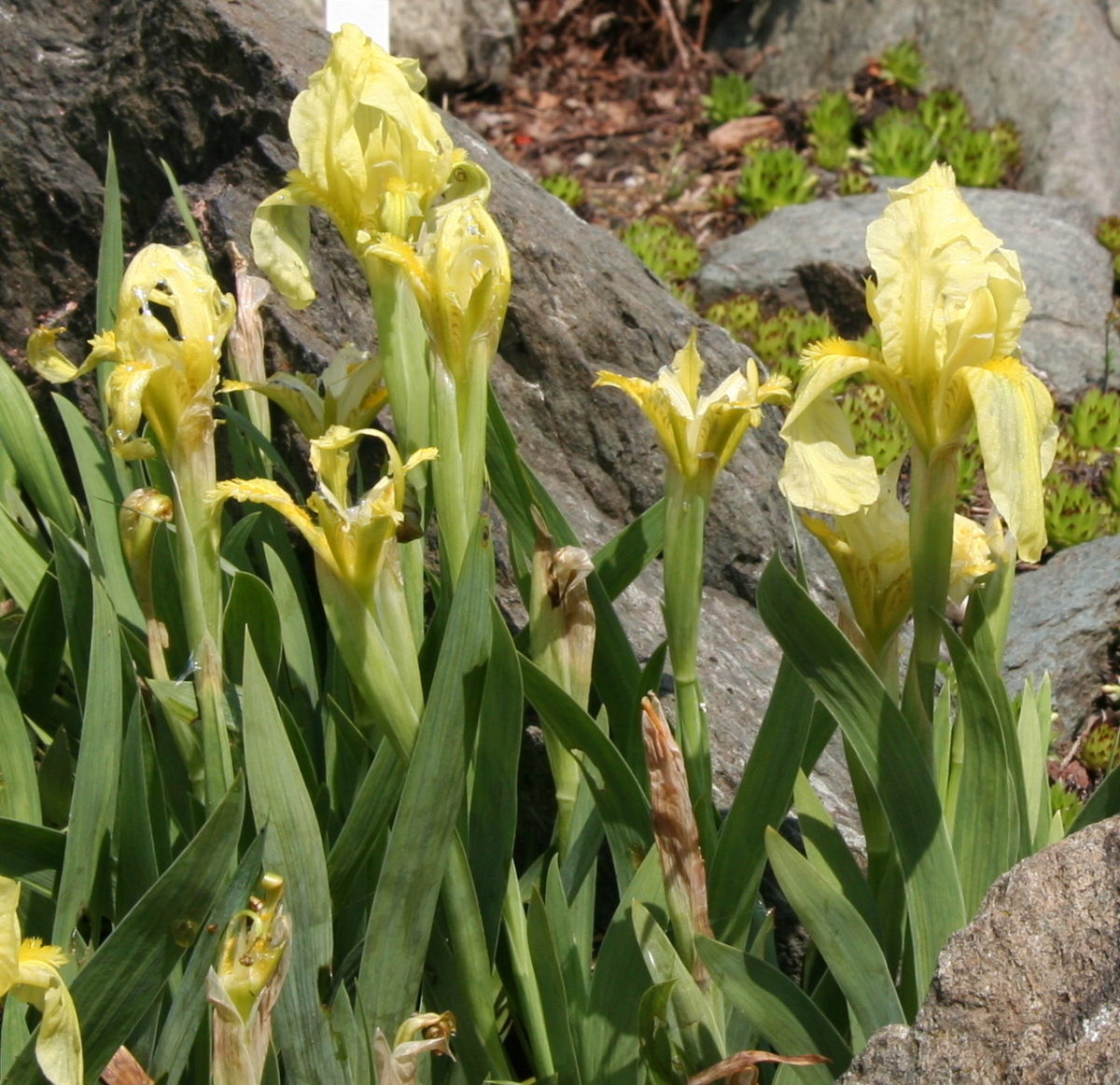
Iris reichenbachii

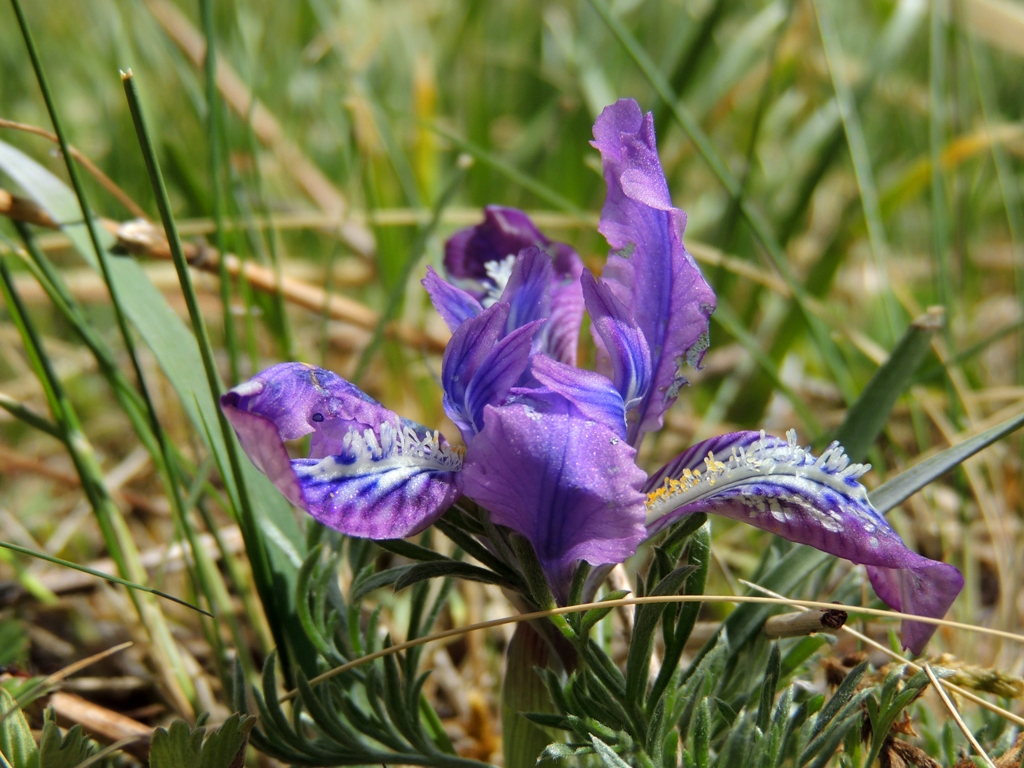
Iris tigridia from Russia

Bearded rhizomatous irises

Section Iris

- Iris adriatica Trinajstic ex Mitic
- Iris albertii Reg.
- Iris albicans – white cemetery iris, white flag iris
- Iris alexeenkoi Grossh.
- Iris aphylla L. – stool iris, table iris, leafless iris (including I. nudicaulis)
  - Iris aphylla subsp. hungarica (Waldst. & Kit.) Helgi
- Iris attica (Boiss. & Heldr.) Hayek
- Iris benacensis A.Kern. ex Stapf
- Iris bicapitata Colas
- Iris calabra (N.Terracc.) Peruzzi
- Iris croatica – Perunika I.Horvat & M.D.Horvat
- Iris cypriana Foster & Baker
- Iris flavescens Delile – lemonyellow iris (= I. variegata?)
- Iris furcata Bieb. – forked iris
- Iris × germanica L. – German bearded iris (includes I. × barbata)
- Iris × germanica nothovar. florentina Dykes
- Iris glaucescens Bunge
- Iris griffithii Baker
- Iris hellenica Dionysios Mermygkas, Kit Tan & Artemios Yannitsaros
- Iris imbricata Lindl.
- Iris junonia Schott ex Kotschy
- Iris kashmiriana Baker
- Iris lutescens Lam. (including I. italica)
- Iris marsica I.Ricci & Colas.
- Iris mesopotamica – Mesopotamian iris
- Iris orjenii – Orjen iris Bräuchler & Cikovac
- Iris pallida – sweet iris, Dalmatian iris Lam.
  - Iris pallida subsp. cengialti (Ambrosi ex A.Kern.) Foster
  - Iris pallida subsp. illyrica (Iris illyrica) (Tomm. ex Vis.) K.Richt.
- Iris perrieri Simonet ex P.Fourn.
- Iris pseudopumila Tineo
- Iris pumila L.
- Iris purpureobractea B.Mathew & T.Baytop
- Iris relicta Colas.
- Iris reichenbachii Heuff. – Reichenbach's iris
- Iris revoluta Colas.
- Iris sambucina L.
- Iris scariosa Willd. ex Link
- Iris schachtii Markgr.
- Iris setina Colas.
- Iris suaveolens Boiss. & Reut. (including I. iliensis)
- Iris subbiflora Brot.
- Iris taochia Woronow ex Grossh.
- Iris timofejewii Woronow
- Iris variegata L. – Hungarian iris

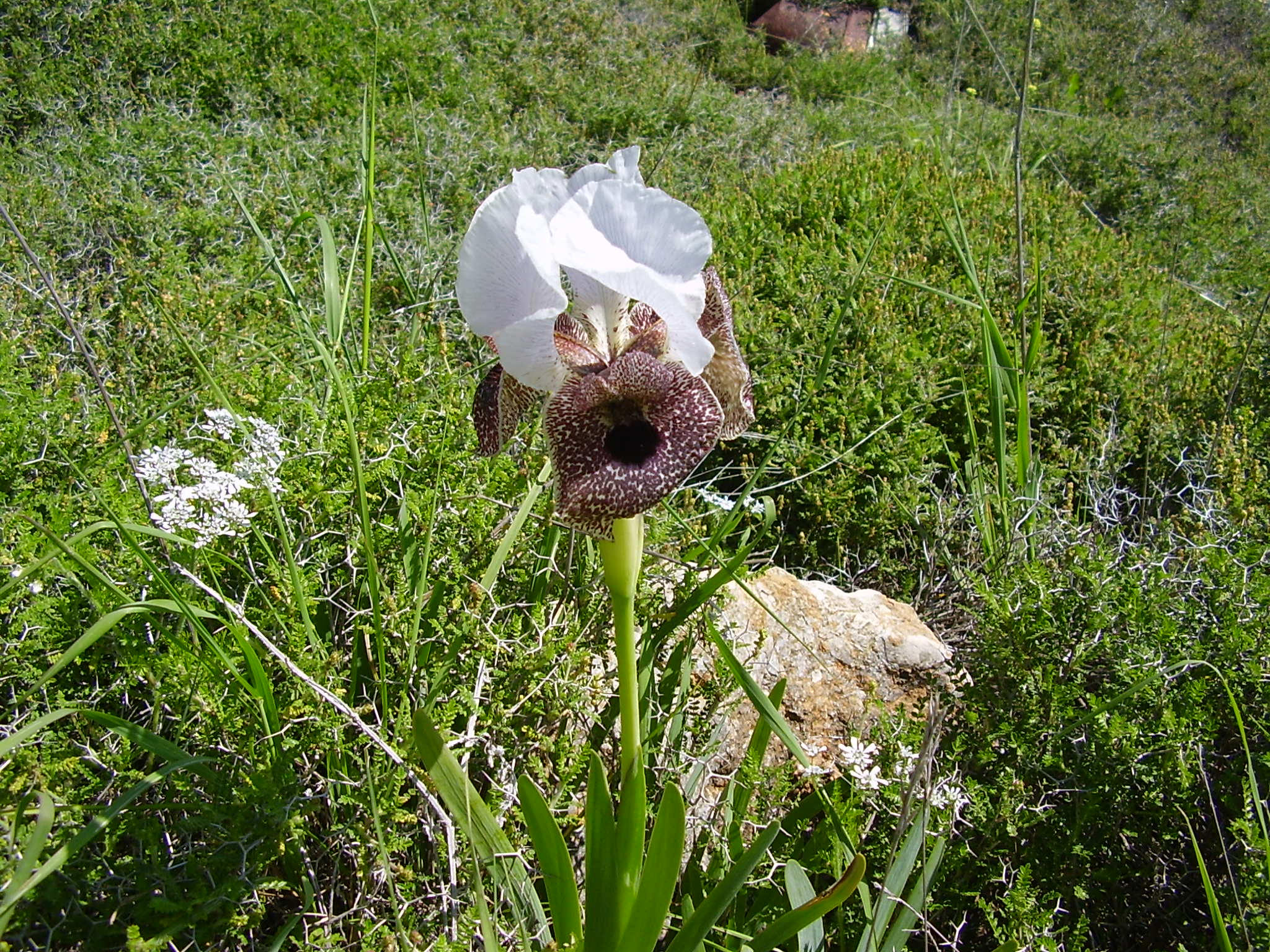
Nazareth Iris, Iris bismarckiana

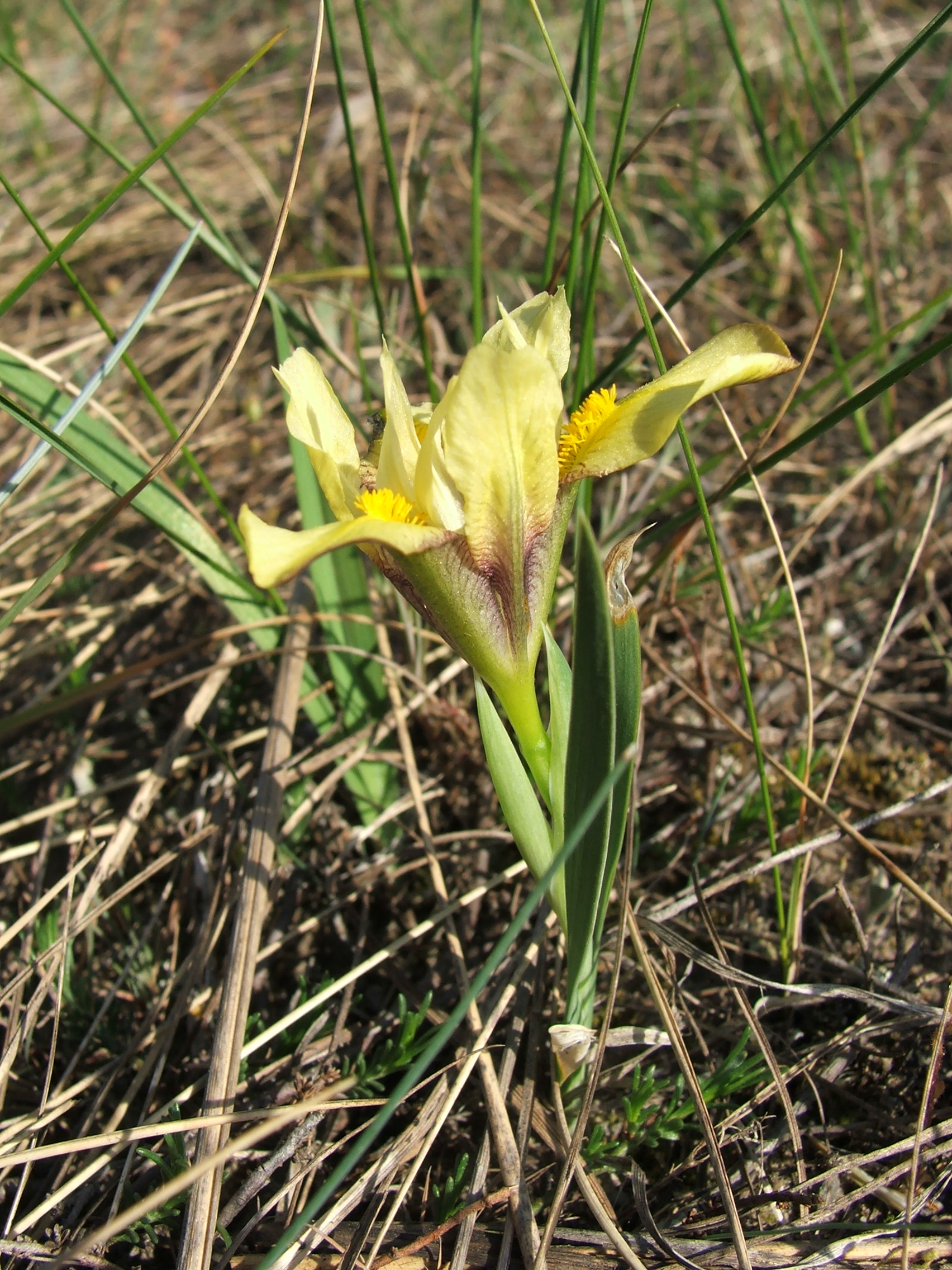
Iris arenaria (formerly Iris humilis subsp arenaria)

Section Oncocyclus

- Iris acutiloba C.A.Mey. (including I. ewbankiana)
- Iris antilibanotica Dinsm.
- Iris assadiana Chaudhary, Kirkw. & C.Weymolauth
- Iris atrofusca Baker
- Iris atropurpurea Baker
- Iris auranitica Dinsm.
- Iris barnumiae Baker & Foster
- Iris basaltica Dinsm.
- Iris bismarckiana Reg. – Nazareth Iris
- Iris bostrensis Mouterde
- Iris camillae Grossh.
- Iris cedreti Dinsm. ex Chaudhary
- Iris damascena Mouterde
- Iris gatesii Foster
- Iris grossheimii Woronow ex Grossh.
- Iris haynei Baker – Gilboa Iris
- Iris hermona Dinsm. – Hermon Iris
- Iris heylandiana Boiss. & Reut.
- Iris iberica Hoffm.
  - Iris iberica subsp. elegantissima (Sosn.) Fed. & Takht.
  - Iris iberica subsp. lycotis (Woronow) Takht.
- Iris kirkwoodii (including I. calcarea)
- Iris lortetii Barbey ex Boiss.
  - Iris lortetii var. samariae (Dinsm.) Feinbrun
- Iris mariae Barbey.
- Iris meda Stapf
- Iris nigricans Dinsm.
- Iris nectarifera Güner
- Iris paradoxa Steven
- Iris petrana Dinsm.
- Iris sari Schott ex Bak.
- Iris schelkownikowii Fomin
- Iris sprengeri Siehe
- Iris susiana L. – Mourning Iris
- Iris swensoniana Chaudhary, G.Kirkw. & C.Weymouth
- Iris westii Dinsm.
- Iris yebrudii Dinsm. ex Chaudhary

Section Hexapogon

- Iris falcifolia Bunge
- Iris longiscapa Ledeb.

Section Psammiris

- Iris arenaria Waldst. & Kit.
- Iris bloudowii Ledeb.
- Iris curvifolia Y.T.Zhao
- Iris humilis Georgi
- Iris kamelinii Alexeeva
- Iris mandshurica Maxim.
- Iris potaninii Maxim.
- Iris vorobievii N.S.Pavlova

Section Pseudoregelia

- Iris cuniculiformis Noltie & K.Y.Guan
- Iris dolichosiphon Noltie
- Iris goniocarpa Bak.
- Iris hookeriana Fost.
- Iris ivanovae Doronkin
- Iris kemaonensis Wall.
- Iris leptophylla Lingelsheim
- Iris narcissiflora Diels.
- Iris sikkimensis Dykes
- Iris tigridia Bunge ex Ledeb.

Section Regelia

- Iris afghanica Wendelbo
- Iris darwasica Regel
- Iris heweri Grey-Wilson & Mathew
- Iris hoogiana Dykes
- Iris korolkowii Regel
- Iris kuschkensis Grey-Wilson & Mathew
- Iris lineata Foster ex Regel
- Iris stolonifera Maxim.

== Subgenus Limniris ==
Beardless rhizomatous irises It has been generally divided into 2 sections, 'Limniris', which is further divided down to about 16 series and 'Lophiris' (also known as 'Evansias' or crested iris.

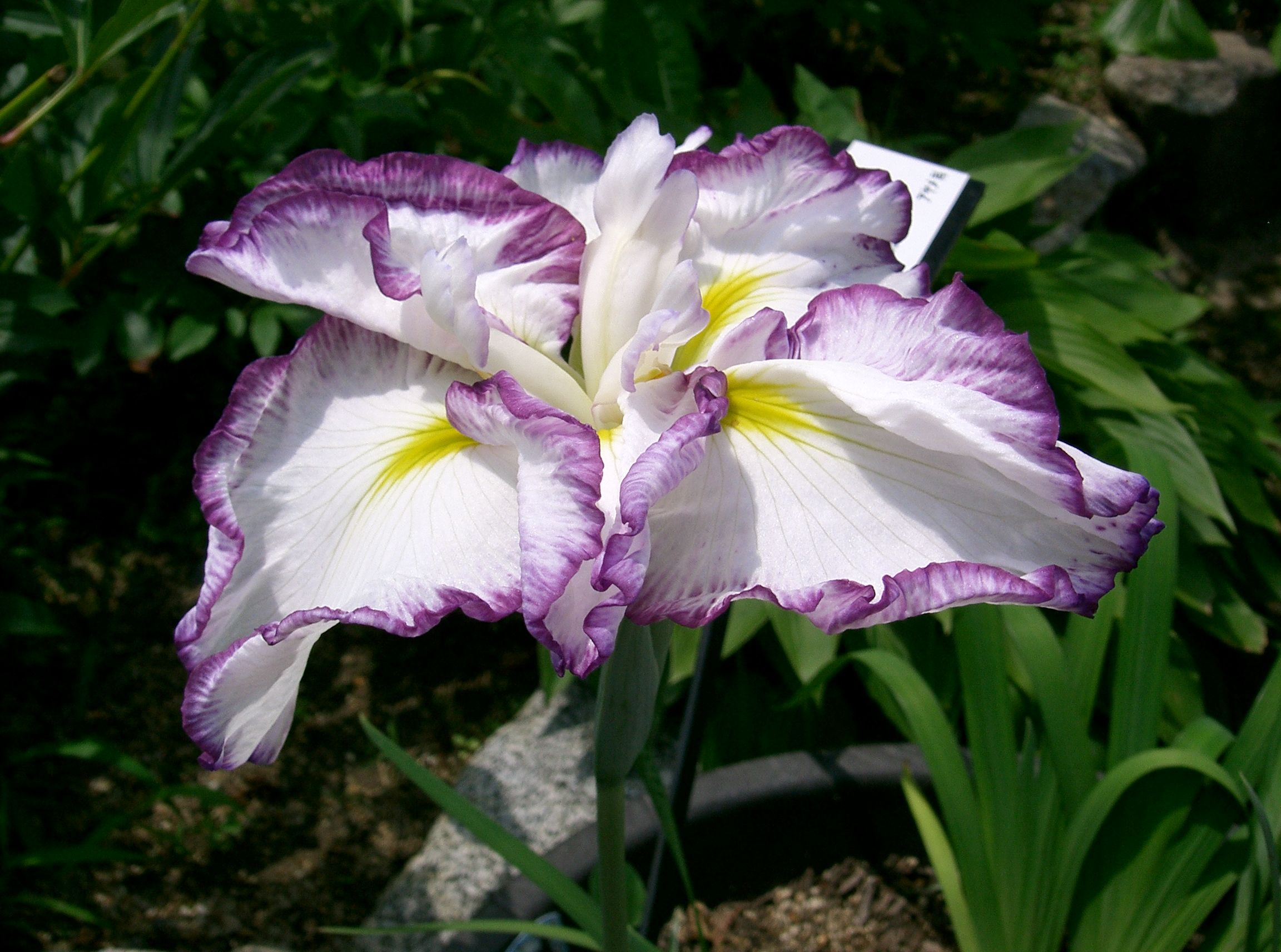
Japanese Iris (Iris ensata) or hanashōbu, cv. 'Kumoinogan'

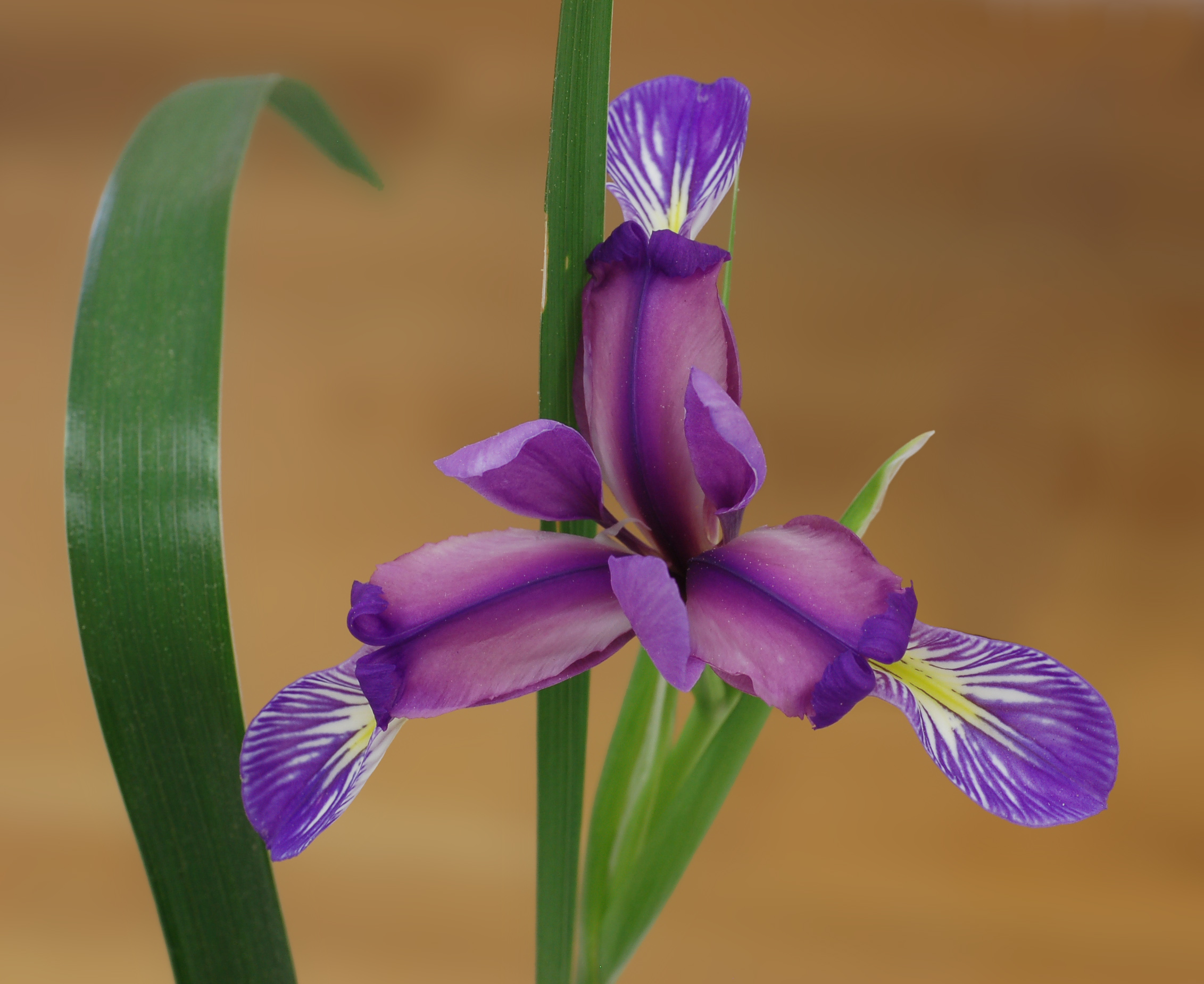
Iris graminea

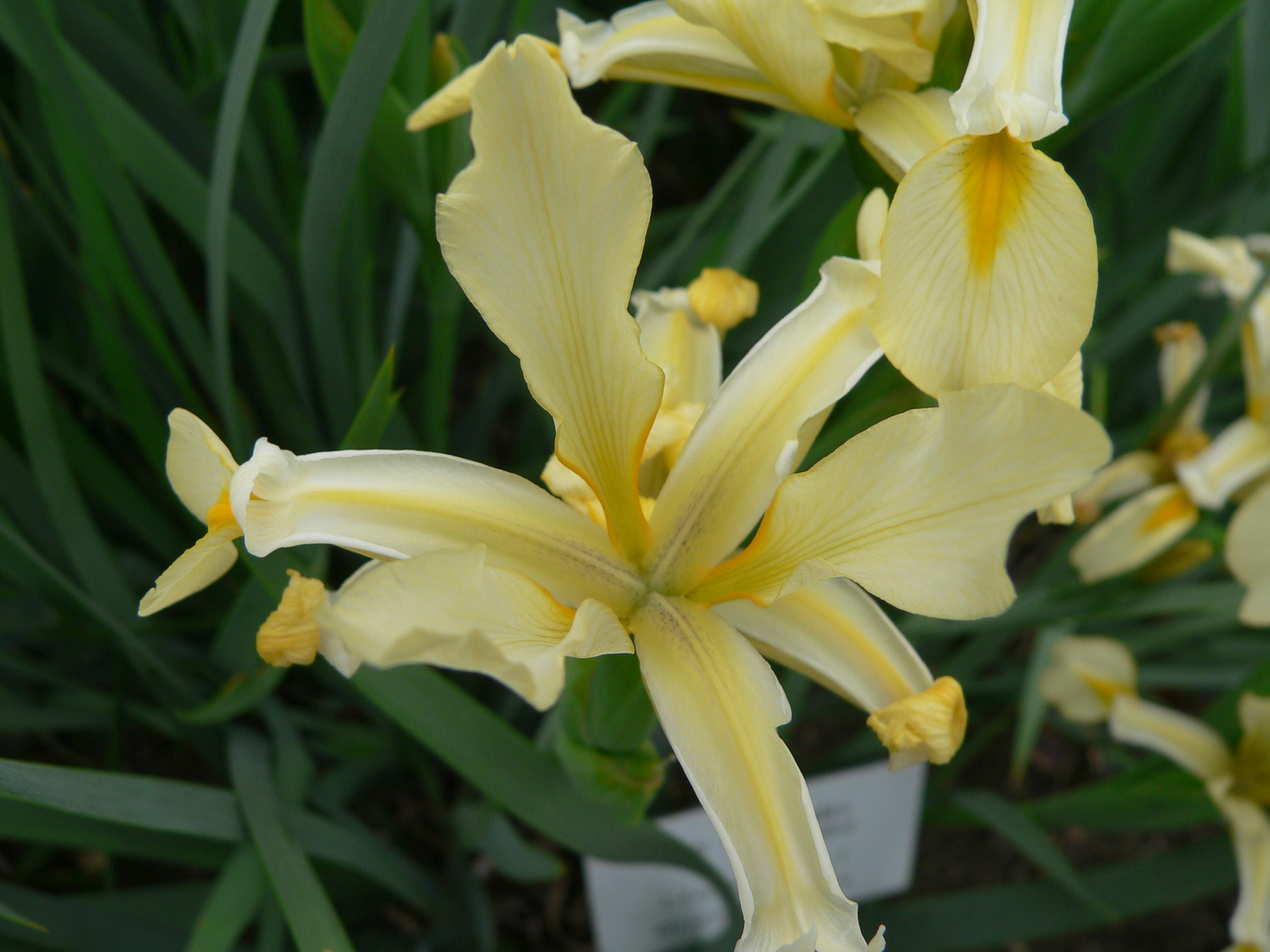
Yellow-banded Iris, Iris orientalis

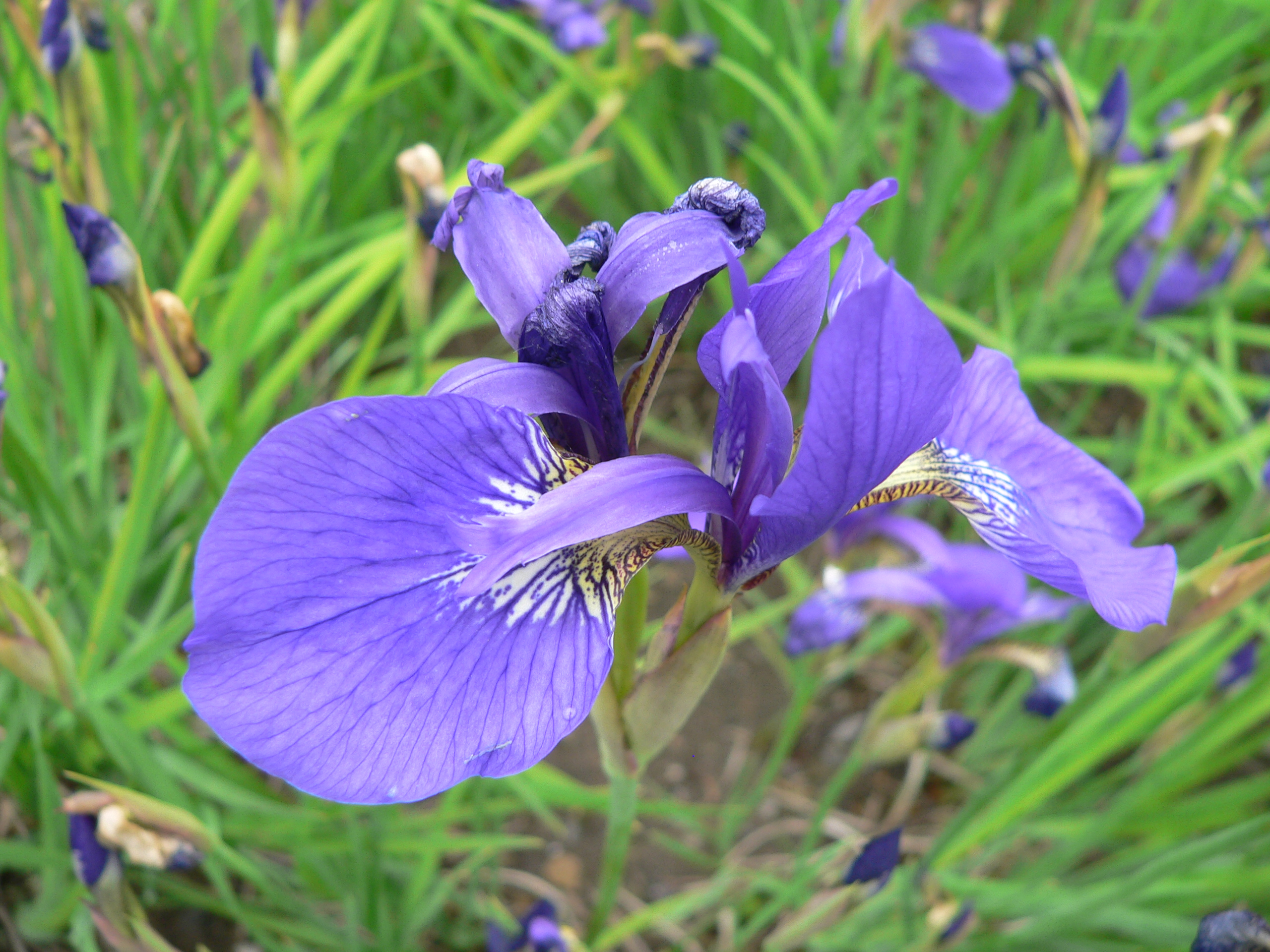
Blood Iris (Iris sanguinea) or ayame

Section Limniris (listed in alphabetical order)

Series Californicae Pacific Coast irises

- Iris bracteata – Siskiyou Iris
- Iris chrysophylla – Yellow-leaved Iris
- Iris douglasiana – Douglas Iris
- Iris fernaldii – Fernald's Iris
- Iris hartwegii – Hartweg's Iris, Rainbow Iris, Sierra Iris
- Iris innominata – Del Norte Iris
- Iris macrosiphon – Bowltube Iris
- Iris munzii – Munz's Iris, Tulare Lavender Iris
- Iris purdyi – Purdy's Iris
- Iris tenax – Tough-leaved Iris, Oregon Iris
- Iris tenuissima Dykes – (Long-tubed Iris)

Series Chinenses (from east Asia)

- Iris henryi Baker
- Iris koreana Nakai
- Iris minutoaurea Makino
- Iris odaesanensis Y.N.Lee
- Iris proantha Diels
- Iris rossii Baker
- Iris speculatrix Hance

Series Ensatae

- Iris lactea Pall.

Series Foetidissimae

- Iris foetidissima L. – Stinking Iris, Gladwin Iris, Stinking Gladwin, Gladdon, Roast-beef Plant

Series Hexagonae (known as the Louisiana irises)

- Iris brevicaulis Raf. – Zigzag Iris
- Iris fulva Ker-Gawl. – Copper Iris
- Iris giganticaerulea – Giant Blue Iris, Giant Blue Flag
- Iris hexagona Walt. – Dixie Iris
- Iris nelsonii Randolph – (Abbeville Iris)
- Iris savannarum Small – Prairie iris

Series Laevigatae (which includes the Japanese irises)

- Iris ensata Thunb. – Japanese Iris, hanashōbu (Japanese) (including I. kaempferi)
- Iris laevigata Fisch – Rabbitear Iris, Shallow-flowered Iris, kakitsubata (Japanese)
- Iris maackii Maxim.
- Iris pseudacorus L. – Yellow Iris, Yellow Flag
- Iris versicolor L. – Larger Blue Flag, Harlequin Blueflag
- Iris virginica L. – Virginia Iris

Series Longipetalae (Rocky Mountain or long-petaled iris)

- Iris longipetala Herb. – (Coast Iris)
- Iris missouriensis – Rocky Mountain Iris, Western Blue Flag

Series Prismaticae (contains just one species from America)

- Iris prismaticaPursh ex Ker-Gawl. – (Slender Blue Flag)

Series Ruthenicae

- Iris ruthenica Ker-Gawl.
- Iris uniflora Pall.

Series Sibiricae (Siberian irises)

- Iris bulleyana Dykes
- Iris chrysographes – Black Iris
- Iris clarkei Baker
- Iris delavayi Micheli
- Iris forrestii Dykes
- Iris sanguinea Hornem. ex Donn – Blood Iris, ayame (Japanese)
- Iris sibirica – Siberian Iris
- Iris typhifolia Kitag.
- Iris wilsonii C.H.Wright

Series Spuriae

- Iris brandzae Prod.
- Iris crocea Jacquem. ex R.C.Foster (including I. aurea)
- Iris graminea L.
- Iris halophila Pall.
  - Iris halophila var. sogdiana (Bunge) Grubov
- Iris kerneriana Asch. & Sint.
- Iris ludwigii Maxim.
- Iris notha M.Bieb.
- Iris orientalis Mill. – (Yellow-banded Iris)
- Iris pontica Zapal.
- Iris pseudonotha Galushko
- Iris sintenisii Janka
- Iris spuria – Blue Iris
  - Iris spuria subsp. carthaliniae (Fomin) B.Mathew
  - Iris spuria subsp. demetrii (Achv. & Mirzoeva) B.Mathew
  - Iris spuria subsp. maritima (Dykes) P.Fourn.
  - Iris spuria subsp. musulmanica (Fomin) Takht.
- Iris xanthospuria B.Mathew & T.Baytop

Series Syriacae (species with swollen leaf bases and spiny bristles)

- Iris grant-duffii Baker
- Iris masia Foster

Series Tenuifoliae (mostly semi-desert plants)

- Iris anguifuga Y.T.Zhao & X.J.Xue
- Iris bungei Maxim.
- Iris cathayensis Migo
- Iris farreri Dykes
- Iris kobayashii Kitag.
- Iris loczyi Kanitz
- Iris qinghainica Y.T.Zhao
- Iris songarica Schrenk
- Iris tenuifolia Pall.
- Iris ventricosa Pall.

Series Tripetalae (mostly having three petals)

- Iris hookeri Penny – Hooker's Iris
- Iris setosa Pallas ex Link – (Beachhead Iris)
- Iris tridentata Pursh – Savanna Iris

Series Unguiculares

- Iris lazica Albov
- Iris unguicularis Poir.

Series Vernae (contains just one species from America)

- Iris verna L. – Dwarf Violet Iris

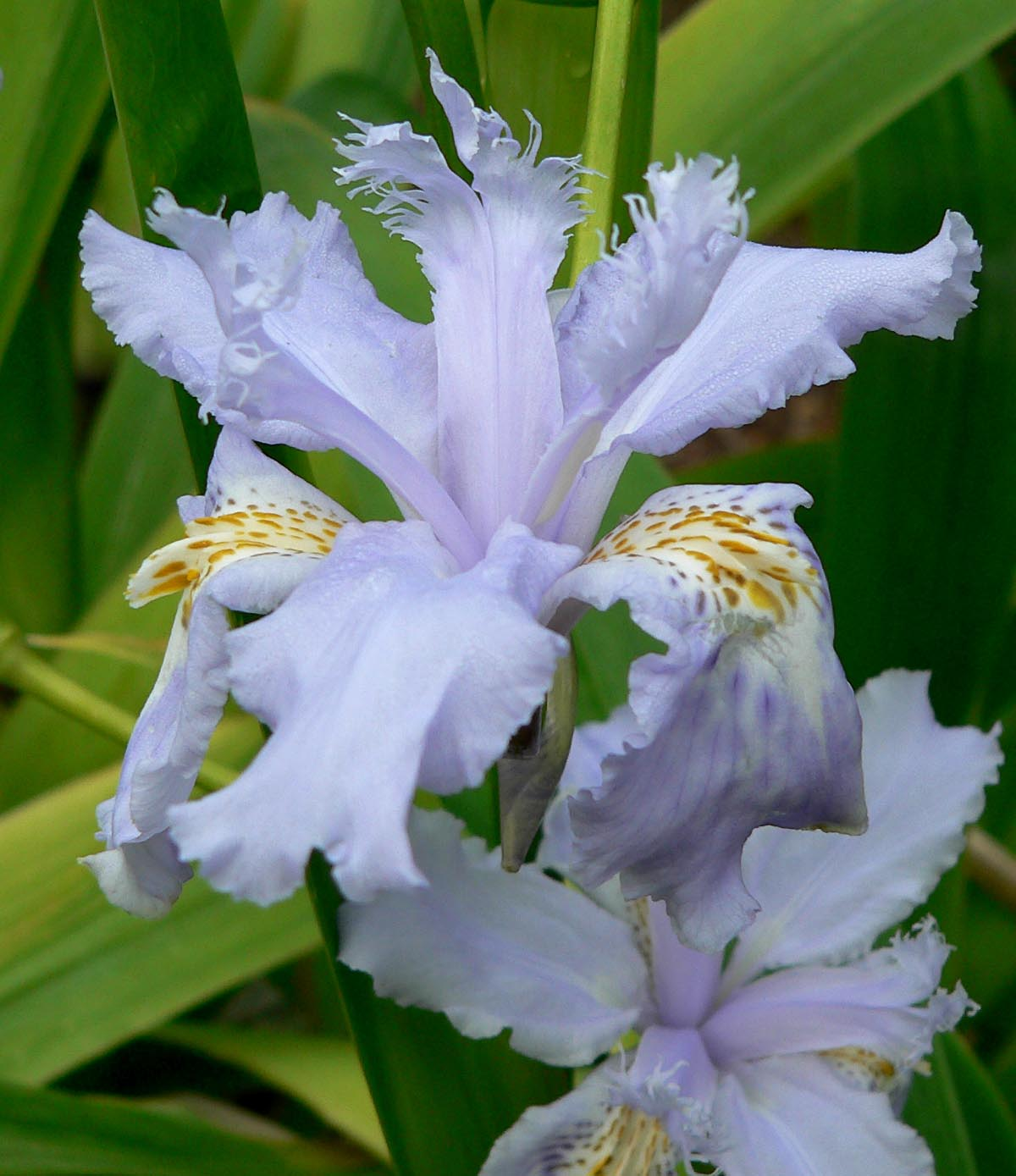
Iris wattii

Section Lophiris

- Iris confusa – Bamboo Iris
- Iris cristata – Crested Iris
- Iris formosana Ohwi
- Iris gracilipes A.Gray
- Iris henryi A.Gray
- Iris japonica Thunb.
- Iris lacustris – Dwarf Lake Iris
- Iris latistyla Y.T.Zhao
- Iris milesii Foster
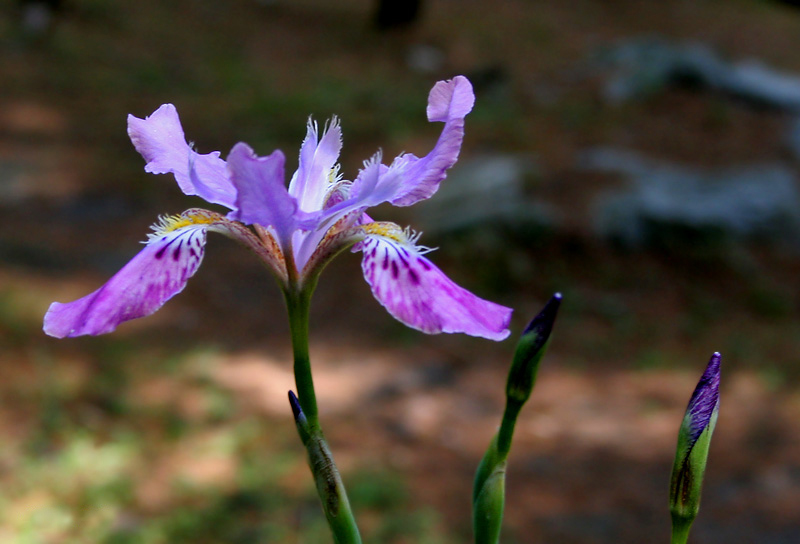
  Iris milesii
- Iris speculatrix Hance
- Iris subdichotoma Y.T.Zhao
- Iris tectorum Maxim. – (Wall Iris)
- Iris tenuis S.Wats. – (Clackamas Iris)
- Iris wattii Baker ex Hook.f.

Section Unguiculares

- Iris lazica Albov
- Iris unguicularis Poiret

Unplaced hybrids

- Iris thompsonii R.C.Foster – (Thompson's Iris) (formerly in I. innominata)
- Iris × robusta E.Anderson. – (Robust Iris) (I. versicolor × I. Virginica)
- Iris × sancti-cyriJ.Rousseau – (Saint-Cyr iris) (I. hookeri × I. versicolor)

== Subgenus Xiphium ==
Smooth-bulbed bulbous irises. Formerly genus Xiphion.

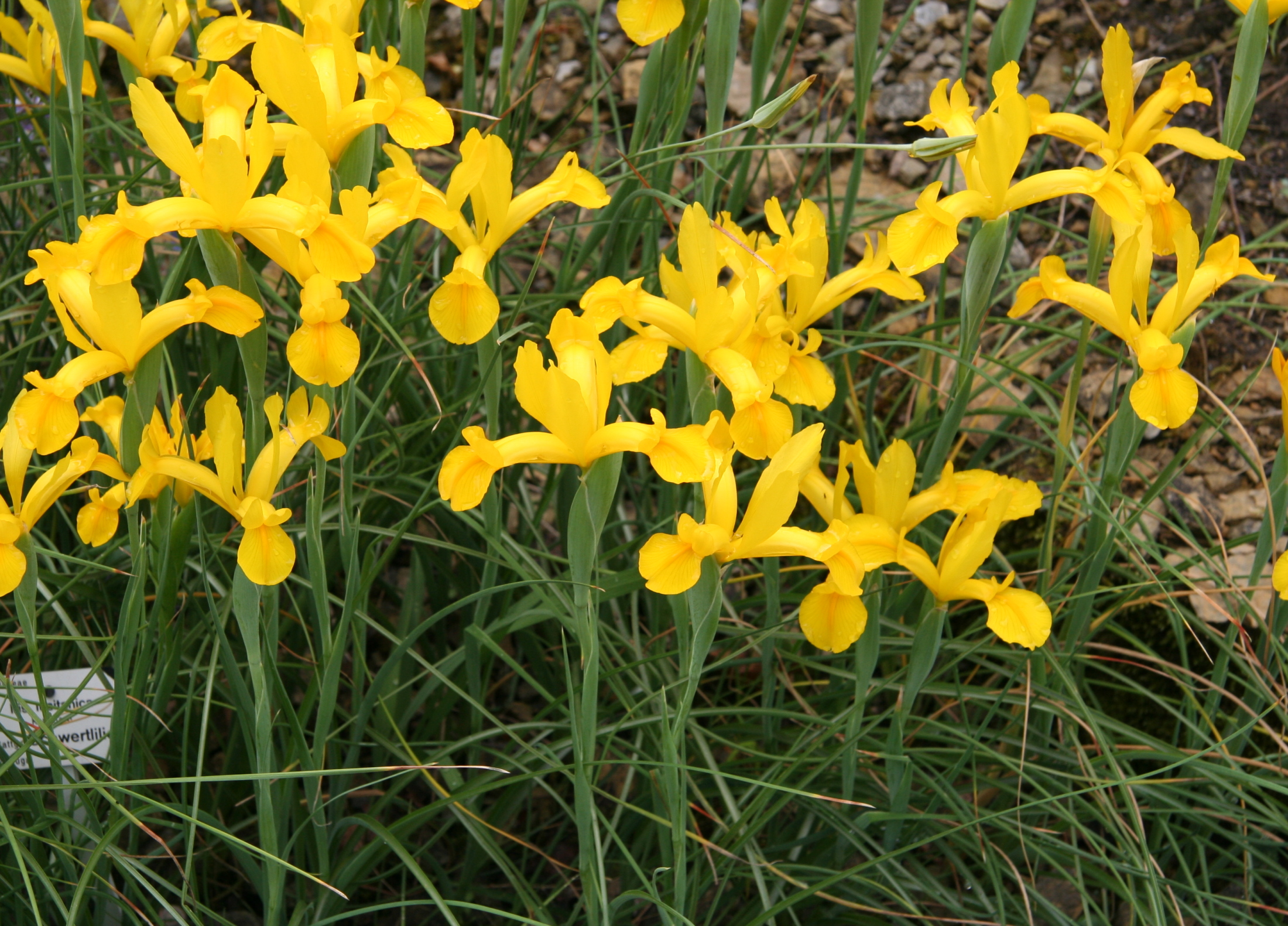
Yellow Spanish Iris, Iris xiphium var. lusitanica

Section Xiphium

- Iris boissieri Henriq
- Iris filifolia Boiss.
- Iris juncea Poir.
- Iris latifolia – English Iris
- Iris lusitanica Ker Gawl.
- Iris rutherfordii M Rodriguez, P Vargas, M Carine and S Jury
- Iris serotina Willk. in Willk. & Lange
- Iris tingitana Boiss. & Reut. – (Morocco Iris)
- Iris xiphium syn. Iris x hollandica – Spanish Iris, Dutch Iris, Small Bulbous-rooted Iris

== Subgenus Nepalensis ==
Bulbous irises. Formerly genus Junopsis.

Section Nepalensis

- Iris collettii Hook.
- Iris decora Wall.
- Iris staintonii H Hara
- Iris barbatula Noltie & Guan

== Subgenus Scorpiris ==
Smooth-bulbed bulbous irises known as "junos". Formerly genus Juno.

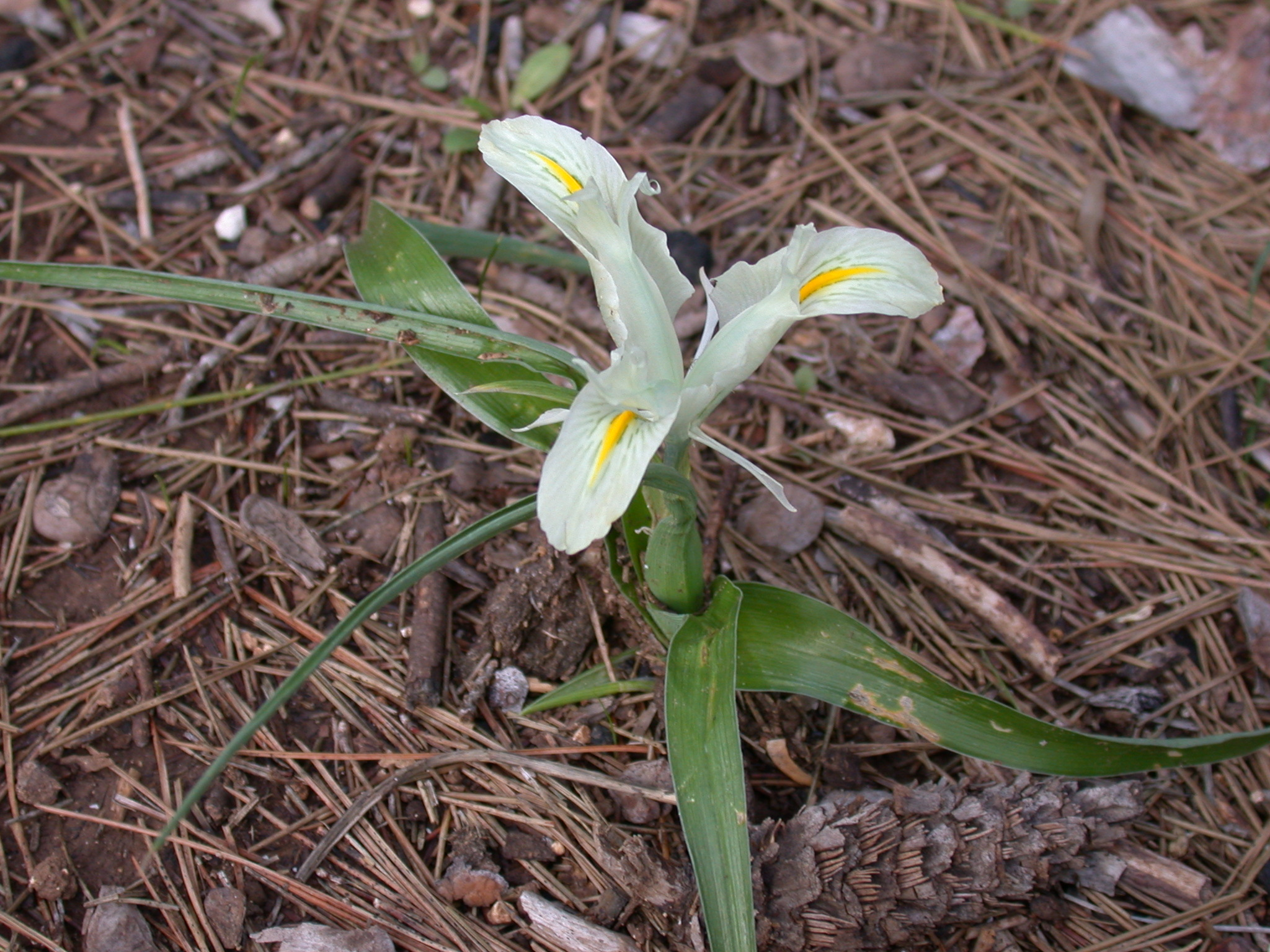
Iris palaestina

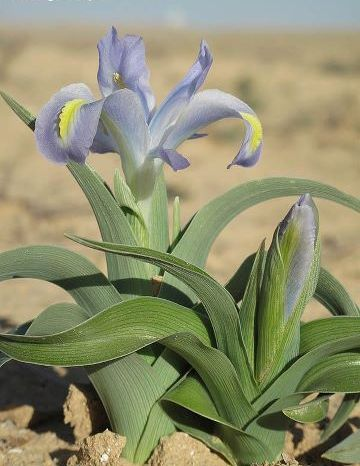
Iris regis-uzziae in Israel

Section Scorpiris

- Iris albomarginata R.C.Foster
- Iris aucheri (Baker) Sealy (including I. sindjarensis)
- Iris bucharica Foster
- Iris caucasica Hoffm.
- Iris cycloglossa Wendelbo
- Iris drepanophylla Aitch. & Baker
- Iris fosteriana Aitch. & Baker
- Iris graeberiana Sealy
- Iris kuschakewicziiB.Fedtsch
- Iris magnifica Vved.
- Iris maracandica (Vved.) Wendelbo
- Iris narynensis O.Fedtsch.
- Iris narbutii O.Fedtsch.
- Iris nicolai (Vved.) Vved.
- Iris orchioides Carriere
- Iris palaestina (Bak.) Boiss.
- Iris persica L.
- Iris planifolia (Mill.) Fiori & Paol.
- Iris postii Mouterde
- Iris pseudocaucasica Grossh.
- Iris regis-uzziae Feinbrun
- Iris rosenbachiana Reg.
- Iris stenophylla Hausskn ex Baker
- Iris tubergeniana Foster (Vved)
- Iris vicaria Vved.
- Iris warleyensis Foster
- Iris willmottiana Foster
- Iris zaprjagajevii Abramov
- Iris zenaidae Botschant

See more species listed in 'Scorpiris' subgenus.

== Subgenus Hermodactyloides ==
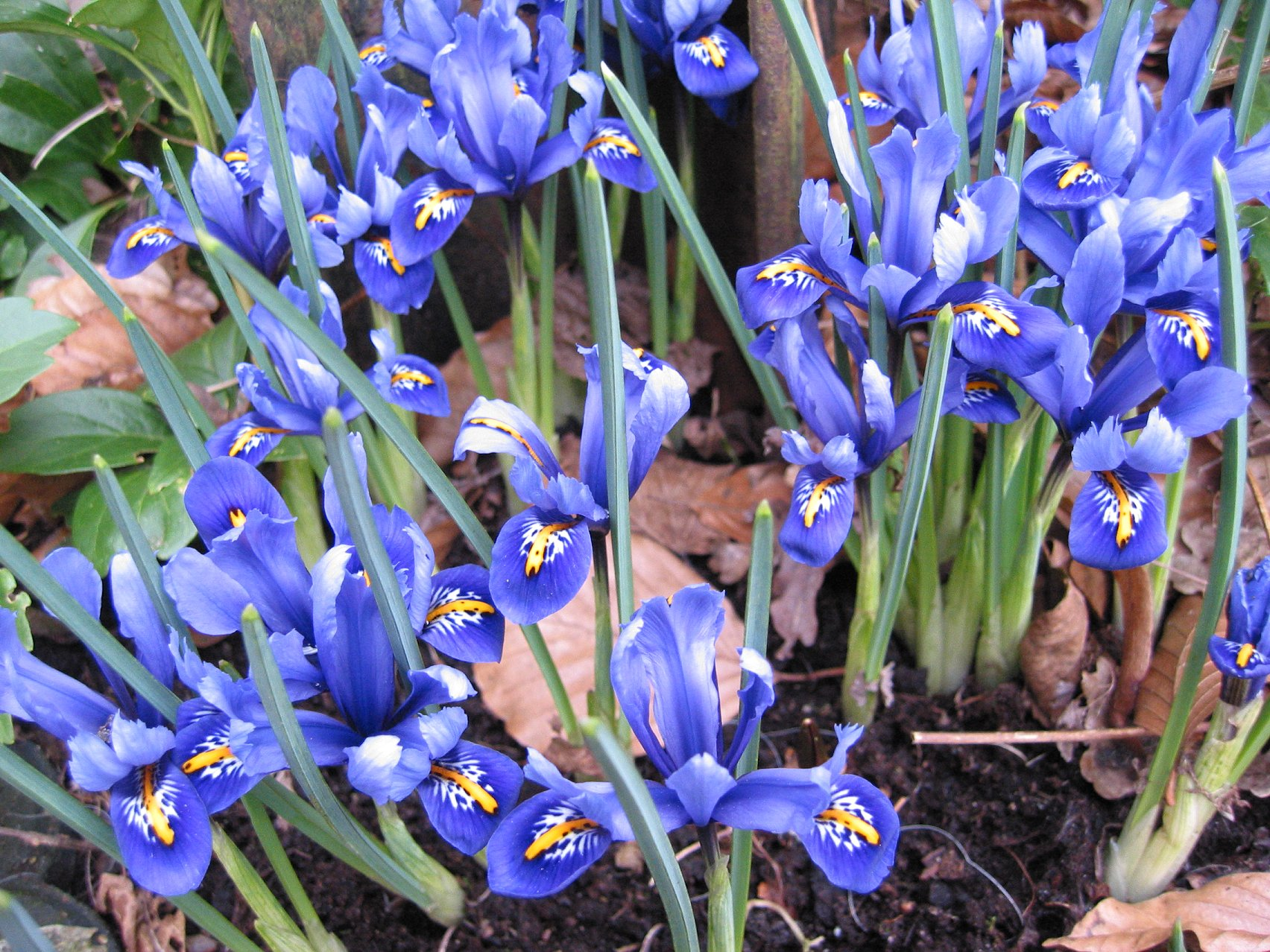
Iris reticulata

Reticulate-bulbed bulbous irises. Formerly genus Iridodictyum.

Section Hermodactyloides

- Iris danfordiae (Baker) Boiss.
- Iris histrio Rchb.f.
- Iris histrioides (G.F.Wilson) S.Arn.
- Iris hyrcana Woronow ex Grossh
- Iris kolpakowskiana Regel
- Iris pamphylica Hedge
- Iris pskemensis Ruskans
- Iris reticulata M Bieb. (includes Iris reticulata var. bakeriana Mathew and Wendelbo)
- Iris tuberosa L.
  - formerly Hermodactylus tuberosus
- Iris vartanii Foster
- Iris winkleri Regel
- Iris winogradowii Fomin

== Subgenus Pardanthopsis ==
- Iris dichotoma Pall. (Vesper iris) (was formerly Pardanthopsis)
- Iris domestica (commonly known as blackberry lily, was once Belamcanda chinensis, but since 2005 now known as Iris domestica)
