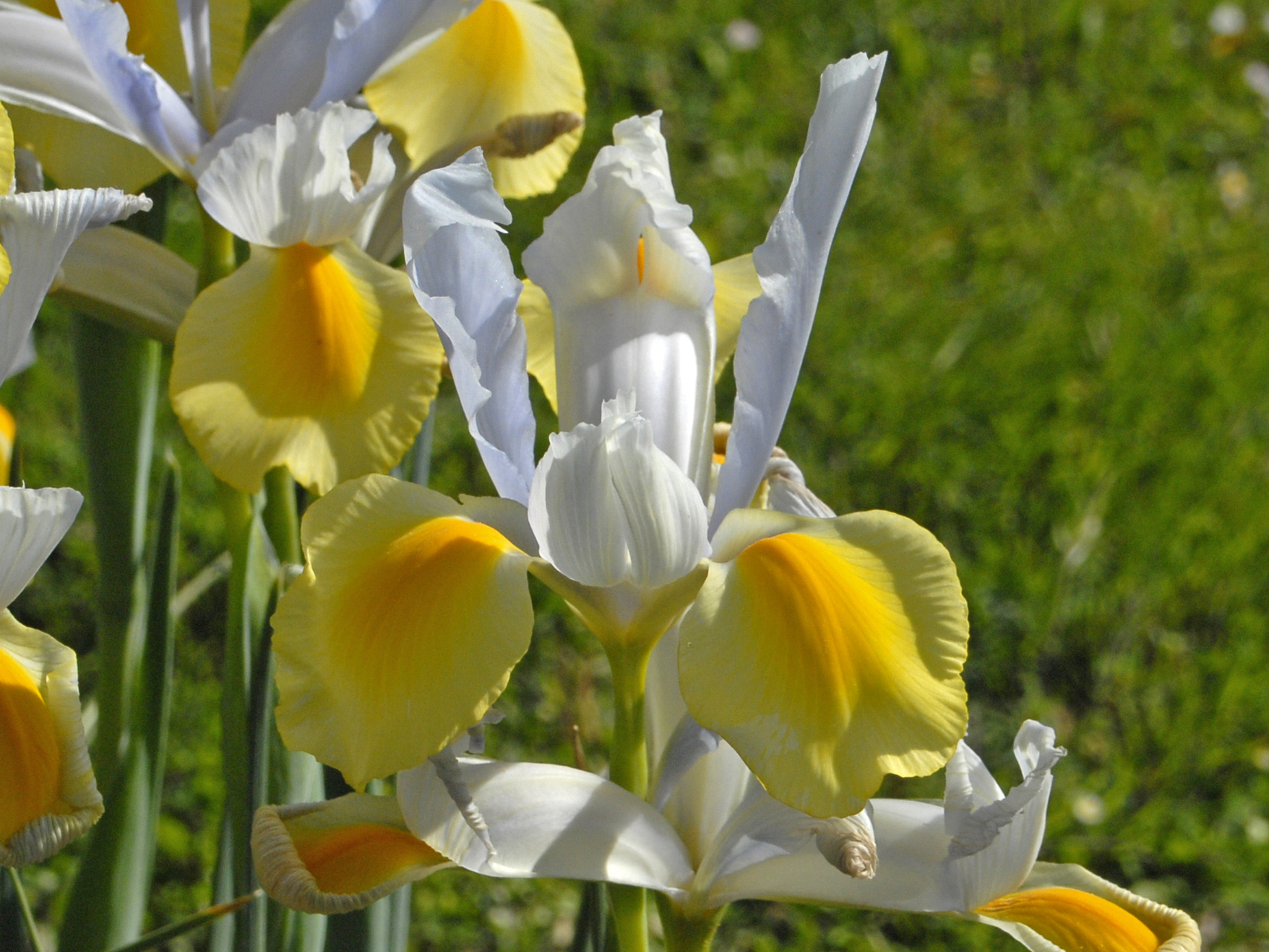
- Iris × hollandica at the Jardin des Plantes, Paris

Scientific classification
- Kingdom: Plantae
- Clade: Tracheophytes
- Clade: Angiosperms
- Clade: Monocots
- Order: Asparagales
- Family: Iridaceae
- Genus: Iris
- Subgenus: Iris subg. Xiphium
- Section: Iris sect. Xiphium
- Species: I. × hollandica

Binomial name
- Iris × hollandica H.R.Wehrh.

= Iris × hollandica =

Species of flowering plant

Iris × hollandica, commonly known as the Dutch iris, is a hybrid iris developed from species native to Portugal, Spain and North Africa (Iris tingitana × Iris xiphium).

Two varieties of Iris xiphium (var. praecox) from Spain and (var. lusitanica) from Portugal, were crossed with Iris tingitana (from North Africa). This was carried out by a Dutch bulb firm 'Van Tubergen' (based in Haarlem) in the 19th century.

Because the bulb could be forced in a greenhouse to flower early, it was popular with florists. Since the 1900s it has been crossed with other species to create various cultivars. After the Second World War, stocks of bulbs were imported to America. They then increased the color range mainly the yellows.

== Description ==
Iris × hollandica has a bulb of about 10 centimetres (3.9 in) and can reach a height of about 60 centimetres (24 in). This bulbous iris has narrow linear green leaves and bears largish blue to yellow to white flowers. They do not have any fragrance. They mainly bloom in May–June in the Northern Hemisphere, and in September–October in the Southern Hemisphere.

== Cultivars ==
There are many known cultivars including;

- 'Imperator' (dark blue)
- 'Wedgwood' (light blue)
- 'White Excelsior' (short white)
- 'Yellow Queen' (light yellow)

== See also ==
- List of Iris species
