= Emily Stevens =

Emily Stevens may refer to:

- Emily Stevens (hybridiser) (1900–1967), New Zealand iris hybridiser
- Emily Stevens (actress) (1883–1928), theatrical performer in Broadway plays
- Emily Pitts Stevens (1841–1906), American educator, activist and suffragist
