= I. juncea =

I. juncea may refer to:

- Iris juncea, a smooth-bulbed bulbous iris
- Isotropis juncea, a plant endemic to Australia
