= Jean Stevens =

Emily Jean Stevens (1900–1967) was a New Zealand iris hybridiser in the 1940s and 1950s who created the 'Pinnacle' iris as well as a number of other outstanding amoenas (iris with white standards and colored falls).

== Childhood ==
Emily Jean Burgess was born on 3 September 1900 at Stratford, New Zealand, to Alfred Henry Burgess and Fanny Eleanor Hollard. Her parents were farmers, and the family moved to Kaiti, Gisborne, where Jean attended Kaiti School and won a scholarship in 1913. The following year, when their youngest daughter fell ill, the family moved to Auckland, where Jean briefly attended Auckland Girls' Grammar School. A subsequent move took the family to Waikanae in 1915, where Jean's parents established a new bulb-growing and cut-flower business. Jean stayed home to care for her youngest sister and also worked in the family business.

== Early hybrids ==
In 1921, Alfred Burgess imported some hybrid cultivars of tall bearded iris, and two years later Jean was given responsibility for their propagation and sale. Her interest in iris awakened, she began experimenting with new crosses and quickly showed aptitude for iris breeding. Her early efforts were guided in part by a paper on the subject by the English iris breeder A. J. Bliss. She joined the Iris Society (later the British Iris Society) and in 1928 sent selections of her own crosses to overseas experts for assessment. Her first success was the Destiny hybrid, which Geoffrey Pilkington, the secretary of the Iris Society, promoted for release on the British market. In 1934, it became the first southern hemisphere–bred iris to receive the society's bronze medal.

In 1936, Jean married Wallace Rex Stevens, a partner in Stevens Brothers nursery, Bulls, whom she had met at a flower show. They had one child, Jocelyn, in 1937.

== Amoena hybrids ==
In 1937, Stevens Brothers began including bearded iris in its catalogues. Between 1936 and 1939, three of Jean's irises won awards of merit from the Royal Horticultural Society, and a fourth prompted the American iris breeder Robert Schreiner to introduce some of her cultivars into the North American market. Their association would continue for another 30 years.

In 1945, Jean and Wallace moved the Stevens Brothers nursery to Bastia Hill, Wanganui. Although the business name remained unchanged, Jean had taken over from Wallace's brother as a full partner. Jean started working on a new challenge: to widen the colour range of tall bearded irises known as amoenas—that is, those with white standards and violet, violet-blue, or purple falls. This involved the difficult task of working with recessive genes in plants with poor germination. In 1949, Stevens introduced Pinnacle, a very fine white and yellow amoena that gained international recognition and became one of the world's most popular iris cultivars. Both the American Iris Society (1951) and the Royal Horticultural Society (1959) granted Stevens an award of merit for its creation. It has been suggested that the originality of 'Pinnacle' would have won Jean the AIS's highest award, the Dykes Medal, if she had been eligible for it. Jean went on to create amoenas in a range of other colours, including deeper yellow, pale blue, plum, and pink shades.

In 1967, her amoena 'Sunset Snows' with its cocoa-tinged pink falls took third place at an international iris competition in Florence and won cups for the best early variety and for the most original colour, marking the first time a prize in the competition had gone to the Southern Hemisphere and the first time that a single cultivar had collected three different prizes. Of all of Stevens' introductions, 'Sunset Snows' has been the most used by other hybridisers especially those searching for pink amoenas.

She worked with other iris groups as well and is thought to have made some of the earliest crosses between Iris juncea and Iris boissieri, as well as between Iris wattii and Iris tectorum.

== Leadership and publications ==
Stevens was active in various horticultural associations. She was a founding member of the Australian Iris Society in 1948, and the following year she became federal president of the renamed Australian and New Zealand Iris Society. Administrative difficulties led to her recommending a separation of the two bodies, and one result of the split was that she cofounded the New Zealand Iris Society with C. A. Teschner and D'Arcy Blackburn in 1949. She served as its president twice (1949–1951; 1956-1957) and was elected a life member in 1959. Stevens was also the editor of the New Zealand Iris Society for 10 years and registrar of New Zealand cultivars from 1957 until her death. Her writings appeared in New Zealand gardening magazines and in iris publications overseas, and in 1952 her handbook for Southern Hemisphere growers, "The Iris and Its Culture," was published in Australia.

Jean and Wallace Stevens also led the way in developing native Australasian and South African flora for cut-flower production, especially proteas and Leucadendron. Jean made the first known crosses between Leucadendron laureolum and Leucadendron salignum, and at her prompting her son-in-law Ian Bell (who joined the partnership around 1961) began a more extensive hybridisation programme from which came 'Safari Sunset', a leucadendron with deep red bracts that became an important export flower.

In the early 1960s, the Stevenses faced losing part of their land to a proposed primary school, but their appeal was supported by New Zealand and British horticultural authorities and was upheld. The Queen Mother visited the Stevens' gardens during her 1966 tour and reportedly left 'with an armful of slips and cuttings'.

Stevens continued to win prestigious awards for her cultivars, including the British Iris Society's Foster Memorial Plaque (1953) and the American Iris Society's hybridisers' medal (1955). Between 1949 and 1961 her cultivars won two awards of merit and six honourable mentions in American iris competitions. She was guest speaker at the American society's annual convention in 1956—the first woman to be so honored—and was appointed an honorary judge in 1962. Early in 1967 Stevens was elected an associate of honour of the Royal New Zealand Institute of Horticulture.

== Legacy ==
Jean Stevens died in Wanganui on 8 August 1967, having registered nearly 400 iris hybrids in her lifetime. The wholesale floristry business was continued by her husband until he died in 1974, and afterwards remained in the family with Ian and Jocelyn Bell.

In 1970, the New Zealand Iris Society inaugurated an annual lecture series, the Jean Stevens Memorial Lecture.
