= Iris rutherfordii =

Scientific classification
- Kingdom: Plantae
- Clade: Tracheophytes
- Clade: Angiosperms
- Clade: Monocots
- Order: Asparagales
- Family: Iridaceae
- Genus: Iris
- Subgenus: Iris subg. Xiphium
- Section: Iris sect. Xiphium
- Species: I. rutherfordii

Binomial name
- Iris rutherfordii Jorge Martin Rodriguez, Pablo Vargas, Mark Carine and Stephen Jury

Species of flowering plant

Iris rutherfordii is a species in the genus Iris, it is also in the subgenus Xiphium. It is a bulbous perennial.

== Taxonomy ==
In June 2004, a joint University of Reading and Natural History Museum funded group (including Dr Stephen Jury – Reading University's Herbarium Curator) was sent on an expedition to Morocco in 2004. They found a group of irises similar in form to Iris serotina, in north Morocco (north of the Kebdana Mountains), at a height of 90 m (300 ft) above sea level. Dr Jury sent a sample of the new iris to Dr Pablo Vargas,(a former Reading University student), now working on related Spanish irises in Madrid. Later, in 2006, another team from Real Jardin Botanico de Madrid (Spanish for Royal Botanical Garden of Madrid) travelled to the same area and found the same species of iris. Then a detailed morphological, phylogenetic and karyological research was carried out on specimens of this iris species. It was found to be distinct from Iris serotina.

It was then published (and described) jointly by Jorge Martin Rodriguez, Pablo Vargas, Mark Carine and Stephen Jury in 'Candollea' Vol. 64: 128 in 2009.

It has been named after Mr Ronald Rutherford, who has been a botanist working at the School of Biological Sciences. He is also Deputy Curator of Reading University's Herbarium.

The newly named Iris rutherfordii is included in an account being prepared in French by Reading botanists for the 'Flore Pratique du Maroc', Morocco's first complete Flora.

Iris rutherfordii is not yet an accepted name by the RHS, as of October 2014.

== Description ==
Iris rutherfordii has a brown bulb (19–27 mm × 12–18 mm) with a paper-like covering. It has 2–3 whitish narrow leaves (which reach up to 35–40 cm long and 1.2–3 mm wide), surrounding a stem about 40–50 cm long. The blue flowers which emerge in June, have a perianth tube about 1.5–4 mm long. It has purple-blue limbs with white nerve-like stripes. The standards are blue. It has yellow pollen and cylinder-like seed capsules which fruit in July.

== Native ==
Iris rutherfordii was found near (the city of) Nador, Rif(region) in North Morocco, a small population (about 50 plants in 2006) growing in open grassland with rocky soil at altitudes of between 50–100 m (160–330 ft) above sea level.

It is beside a recently widened road, so may be in endanger of extinction. The population of iris meets the criteria for 'Critically Endangered', set by IUCN(International Union for Conservation of Nature).
