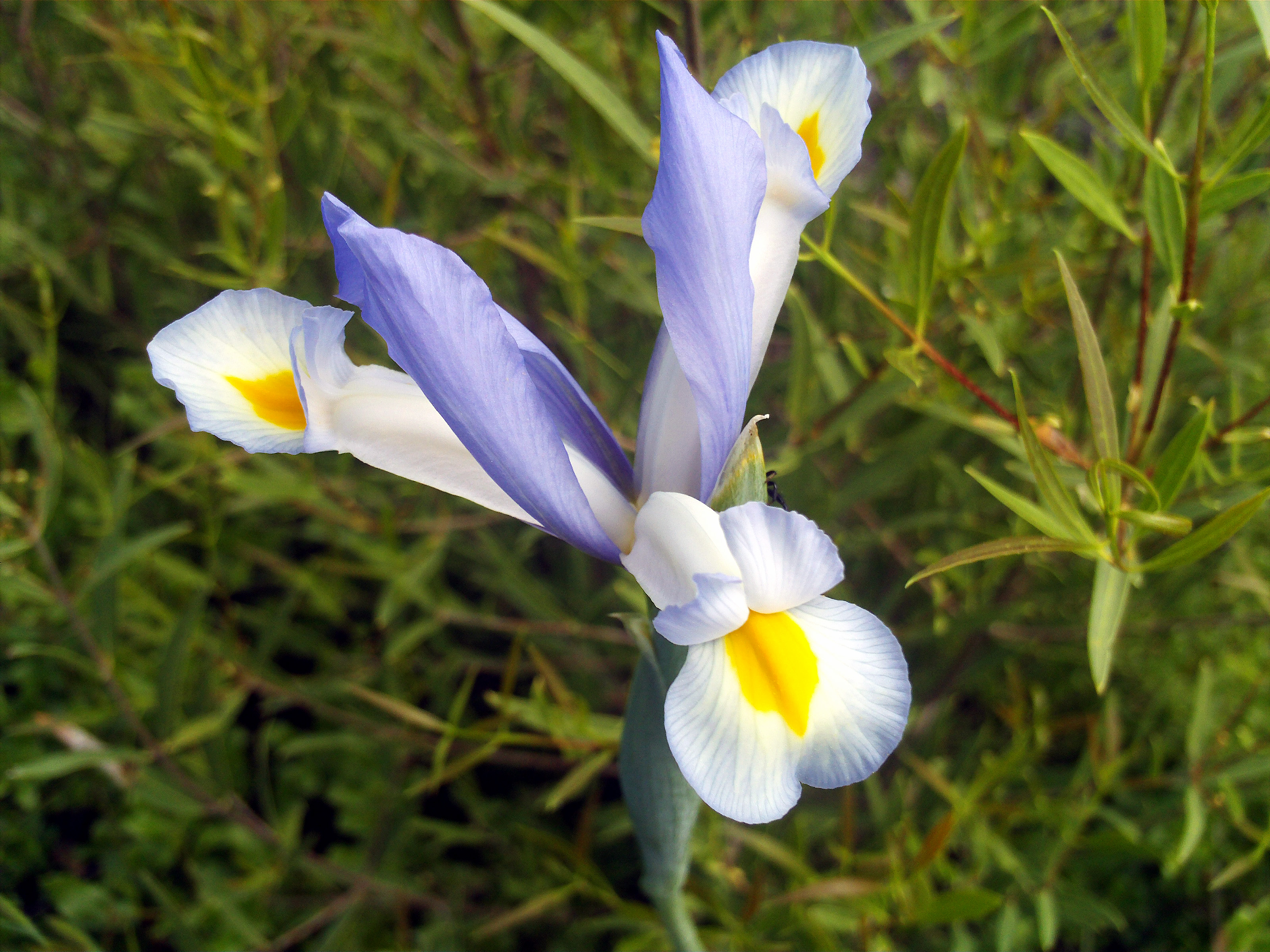
- Close-up image of Iris xiphium

Scientific classification
- Kingdom: Plantae
- Clade: Tracheophytes
- Clade: Angiosperms
- Clade: Monocots
- Order: Asparagales
- Family: Iridaceae
- Genus: Iris
- Subgenus: Iris subg. Xiphium (Miller) Spach

Type species
- Iris xiphium

Species
- See text

= Iris subg. Xiphium =

Subgenus of flowering plants

Subgenus Xiphium is a subgenus of Iris. If considered a separate genus from Iris, it is known as genus Xiphion.

The Latin specific epithet Xiphium refers to the Greek word for sword xiphos.

All species in this subgenus are true bulbs, and are native to southwest Europe (southern Spain, Portugal and southern France) and northern Africa.

Mainly known for the garden cultivars known as Dutch Iris, Spanish Iris and English Iris. They generally flower between early to mid-summer and each stem produces between 1 - 3 flowers. Most bulbs should be planted in late autumn, 10 cm deep and between 5–10 cm apart.

Section Xiphium

Image	Scientific name	Distribution
	Iris boissieri Henriq 1885	Spain and Portugal
	Iris filifolia Boiss. 1842	Morocco, Spain
	Iris juncea Poir. 1789	Algeria, Tunisia Spain, Sicily
	Iris latifolia Mill. 1895 – English iris	France, Spain
	Iris rutherfordii M Rodriguez, P Vargas, M Carine and S Jury 2009	Morocco
	Iris serotina Willk. in Willk. & Lange 1861	Spain and Morocco.
	Iris tingitana Boiss. & Reut. 1852 – Morocco iris	Morocco, Algeria, Spain, Portugal.
	Iris xiphium L. 1753	Corsica, France, Italy, Algeria and Tunisia

Horticultural hybrids

- Iris × hollandica (Spanish iris, Dutch iris)
