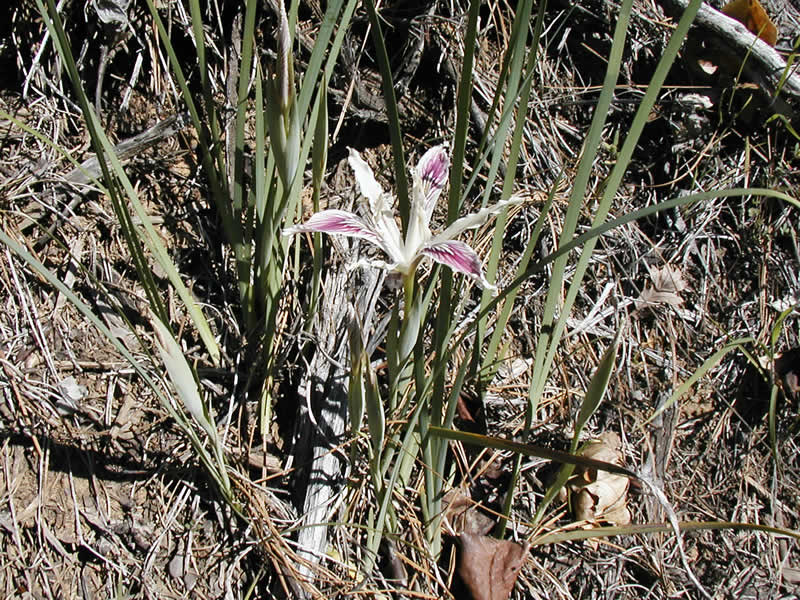

Scientific classification
- Kingdom: Plantae
- Clade: Tracheophytes
- Clade: Angiosperms
- Clade: Monocots
- Order: Asparagales
- Family: Iridaceae
- Genus: Iris
- Subgenus: Iris subg. Limniris
- Section: Iris sect. Limniris
- Series: Iris ser. Californicae
- Species: I. tenuissima

Binomial name
- Iris tenuissima Dykes

= Iris tenuissima =

Species of flowering plant

Iris tenuissima is a species of iris known by the common name longtube iris.

It is endemic to California, where it is a common wildflower in the woodlands and forests of the northern part of the state.

== Description ==
This rhizomatous perennial herb produces narrow leaves and an erect inflorescence bearing two iris flowers. The flower has a long tubular throat which may exceed 5 centimeters in length before it opens into white, purple, or reddish-brown streaked tepals.

=== Subspecies ===
- Iris tenuissima ssp. purdyiformis—affinity to serpentine soil.
- Iris tenuissima ssp. tenuissima
