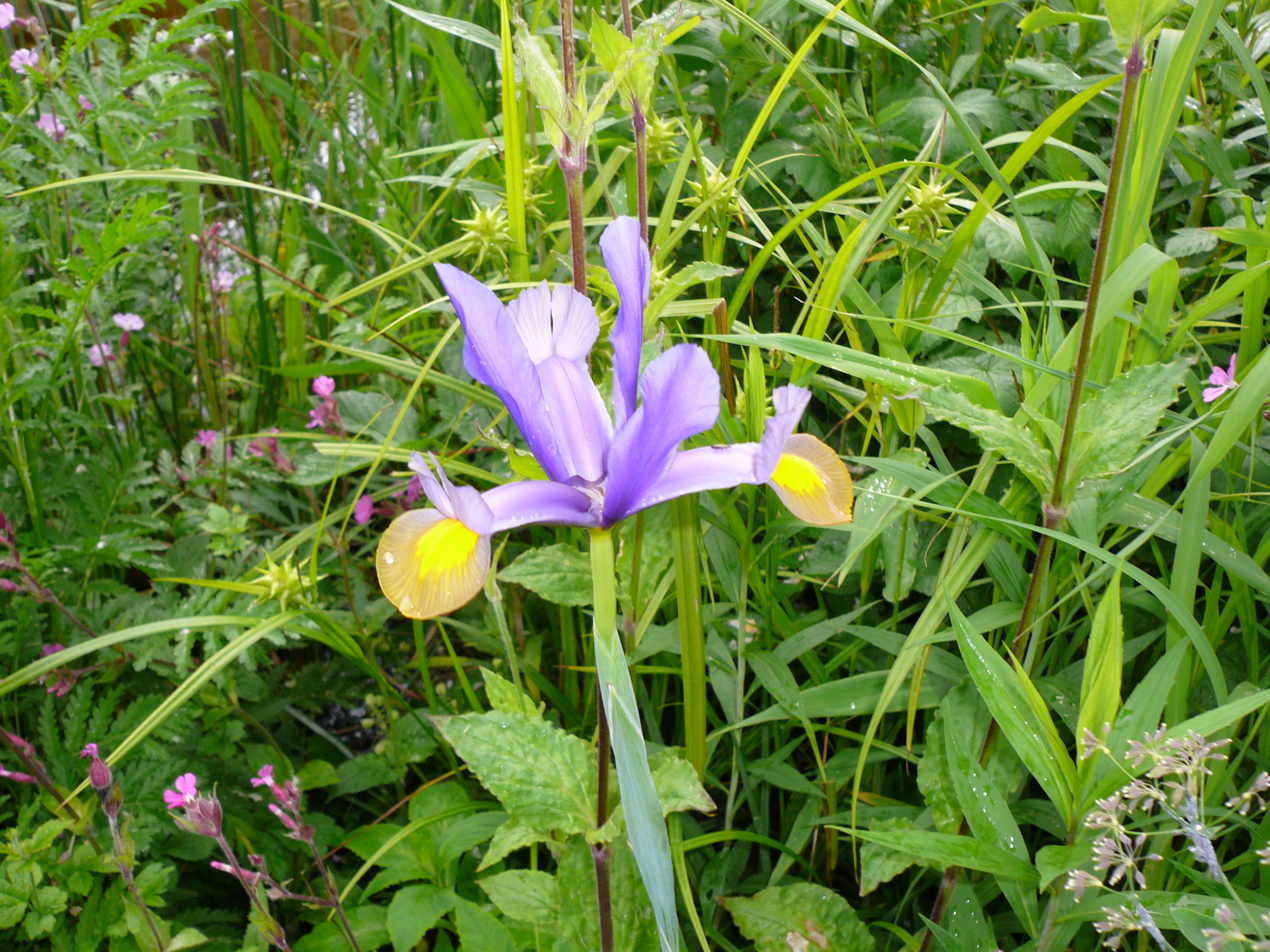

Conservation status
- Least Concern (IUCN 3.1)

Scientific classification
- Kingdom: Plantae
- Clade: Tracheophytes
- Clade: Angiosperms
- Clade: Monocots
- Order: Asparagales
- Family: Iridaceae
- Genus: Iris
- Subgenus: Iris subg. Xiphium
- Section: Iris sect. Xiphium
- Species: I. xiphium

Binomial name
- Iris xiphium L.

Synonyms
- Iris coronaria Salisb.; Iris hispanica Steud.; Iris spectabilis Spach [Illegitimate]; Iris taitii Foster; Iris variabilis Jacq.; Iris xiphia St.-Lag. [Spelling variant]; Iris xiphium var. battandieri Foster; Iris xiphium f. durandoi Batt.; Xiphion verum Schrank; Xiphion vulgare Mill.

= Iris xiphium =

Spanish iris

Species of flowering plant in the iris family

Iris xiphium, commonly known as the Spanish iris, is an iris native to Spain and Portugal. It has also been found in Corsica, South West France, southern Italy, Algeria and Tunisia. This species is also known as the small bulbous-rooted iris or xiphium iris.

It was first illustrated in 'Flowers of the Mediterranean' in 1965.

It is bulbous and bears blue, violet, white or yellow flowers, though they are not so large as those of I. xiphiodes. They are around 6 cm (2.4 in) wide. The plant can reach up to 80 cm (31 in), It typically flowers in May and June, but not always.

The greyish-green leaves emerge in autumn, they grow between 20–70 cm (7.9–28 in) tall. The leaves die after the flowers fade.

The Spanish iris is favoured by florists for its striking colour combinations. This species has several varieties popular in horticulture, among them var. lusitanica whose flowers are yellow all over.

It is among the hardier bulbous irises, and can be grown in northern Europe. But not in all of North America, where frosts would damage the autumn foliage. It requires to be planted in thoroughly drained beds in very light open soil, moderately enriched, and should have a rather sheltered position.

== Hybrids ==
A popular hybrid (Iris tingitana × Iris xiphium) is known as Dutch Iris or Iris × hollandica.

== Cultivars ==
Known cultivars; Most growing up to 80 cm (32 in) tall with lance shaped mid-green leaves.

- 'Blue Angel' (mid blue)
- 'Bronze Queen' (golden brown)
- 'Golden Harvest' (deep rich yellow)
- 'Lusitanica' (yellow)
- 'Professor Blaauw' (deep blue)
- 'Purple Sensation' (purple)
- 'Queen Wilhelmina' (white)
- 'Wedgewood' (bright blue)
- 'White Excelsior' (white, with yellow stripe down the fall centres)
