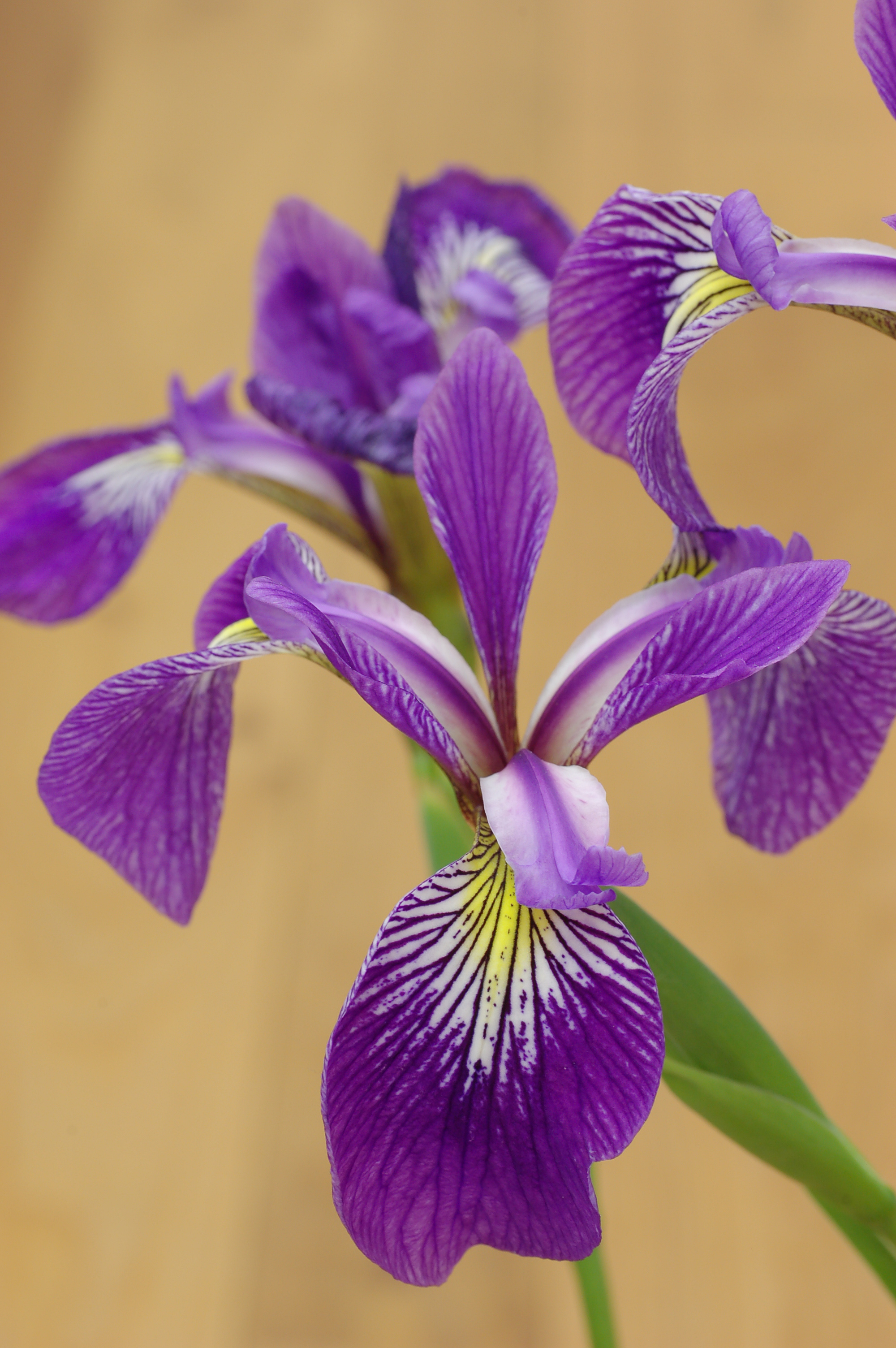

Scientific classification
- Kingdom: Plantae
- Clade: Tracheophytes
- Clade: Angiosperms
- Clade: Monocots
- Order: Asparagales
- Family: Iridaceae
- Genus: Iris
- Species: I. × robusta

Binomial name
- Iris × robusta E.S.Anderson

= Iris × robusta =

Hybrid species of flowering plant in the iris family

Iris × robusta, called the Windermere iris, is a hybrid species of flowering plant in the family Iridaceae. Its parents are Iris versicolor and Iris virginica, both of which are native to North America. Wild populations have been found in Michigan and Ontario, and it has been introduced into Great Britain. It is a rhizomatous perennial, characterised by its violet-blue flowers and purple-flushed foliage. It has a number of cultivars, including 'Gerald Darby', 'Mountain Brook', 'Purple Fan' and 'Nutfield Blue'. Its cultivar 'Dark Aura' has gained the Royal Horticultural Society's Award of Garden Merit.
