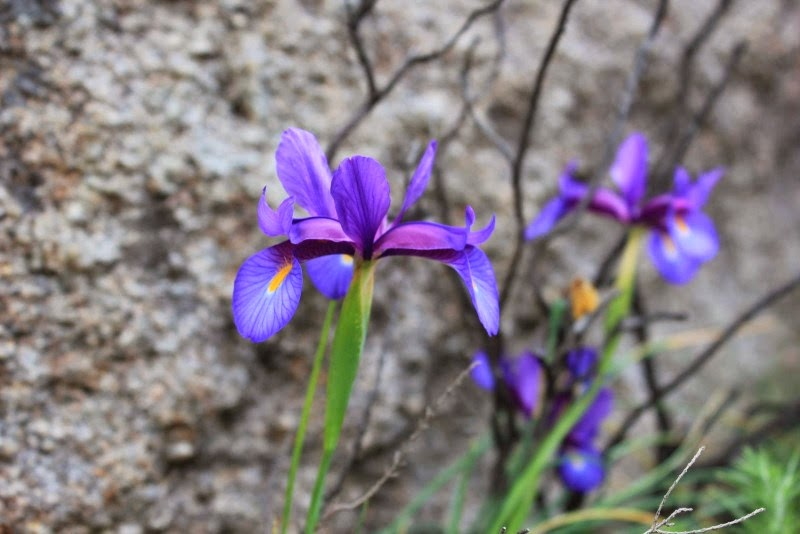

Conservation status
- Critically Endangered (IUCN 3.1)

Scientific classification
- Kingdom: Plantae
- Clade: Tracheophytes
- Clade: Angiosperms
- Clade: Monocots
- Order: Asparagales
- Family: Iridaceae
- Genus: Iris
- Subgenus: Iris subg. Xiphium
- Section: Iris sect. Xiphium
- Species: I. boissieri

Binomial name
- Iris boissieri Henriq

Synonyms
- Iris diversifolia (Merino); Xiphion boissieri (Henrinq.) Rodion; Iris heterophylla Merino

= Iris boissieri =

Species of flowering plant

Iris boissieri (also known as the yellowbeard iris), is a species in the genus Iris, it is also in the subgenus Xiphium. It is from Europe, mainly Spain and Portugal. It has blue-purple (or deep purple) flowers with a yellow beard.

== Description ==
It flowers in June. It normally has only one flower per stem. The flower is blue-purple (or deep purple), with a yellow or orange beard. It grows between 30 and 40 cm tall. The leaves appear in spring.

It is the only bearded iris in the 'Xiphion' section.

== Taxonomy ==
It is also known as the 'yellowbeard iris'.

Named after Edmond Boissier (a Swiss botanist 1810-1885).

In 1877, Mr A.W. Tait (from Porto, Portugal) sent the bulbs to Sir Michael Foster who grew them in the UK. It was first described in 1885 by Portuguese botanist Julio Augusto Henriques in Boletim da Sociedade Broteriana Vols. 1-28.

It was also described by Mr Foster in 'The Gardeners' Chronicles' of 1887, vol. ii. page38. It was then described in Curtis's Botanical Magazine 7097 in 1890 again by Mr Foster.

It was verified by United States Department of Agriculture and the Agricultural Research Service on 4 April 2003 and then updated on 2 December 2004.

== Distribution and habitat ==
Iris boissieri is native to Europe.

=== Range ===
It was originally found in the Serra do Gerês (a mountain range in Portugal), Northwest Spain, within (Galicia).

=== Habitat ===
It likes to grows in rocky shallow soils, at an altitude of 2,000–3,000 feet (610–910 m) above sea level.

== Conservation ==
It was on the 1997 IUCN Red List of Threatened Plants. It was listed on the European Red List of Vascular Plants in 2011 as Data Deficient (DD).

Very few plants (less than a 1000) were found in Spain in 2004 and less than a 10,000 plants were found in Portugal. Also these numbers were gradually going down as well.

Iris boissieri was listed on Annex IV of the Habitats Directive (of the European Union). It was therefore assessed as 'Critically Endangered'.

== Cultivation ==
It is best grown in a bulb frame.

There is a specimen in the Kew Herbarium, collected by Winkler in 1876. There is also a specimen in the 'Conservatoire et Jardin botaniques' in Genève, collected in 1899.

=== Hybrids and cultivars ===
Emily Jean Stevens (1900–1967) was a hybridiser of Iris boissieri and Iris juncea in the 1950s.

== Other sources ==
- Mathew, B. 1981. The Iris. (Iris) 135.
- Tutin, T. G. et al., eds. 1964–1980. Flora europaea. (F Eur)
