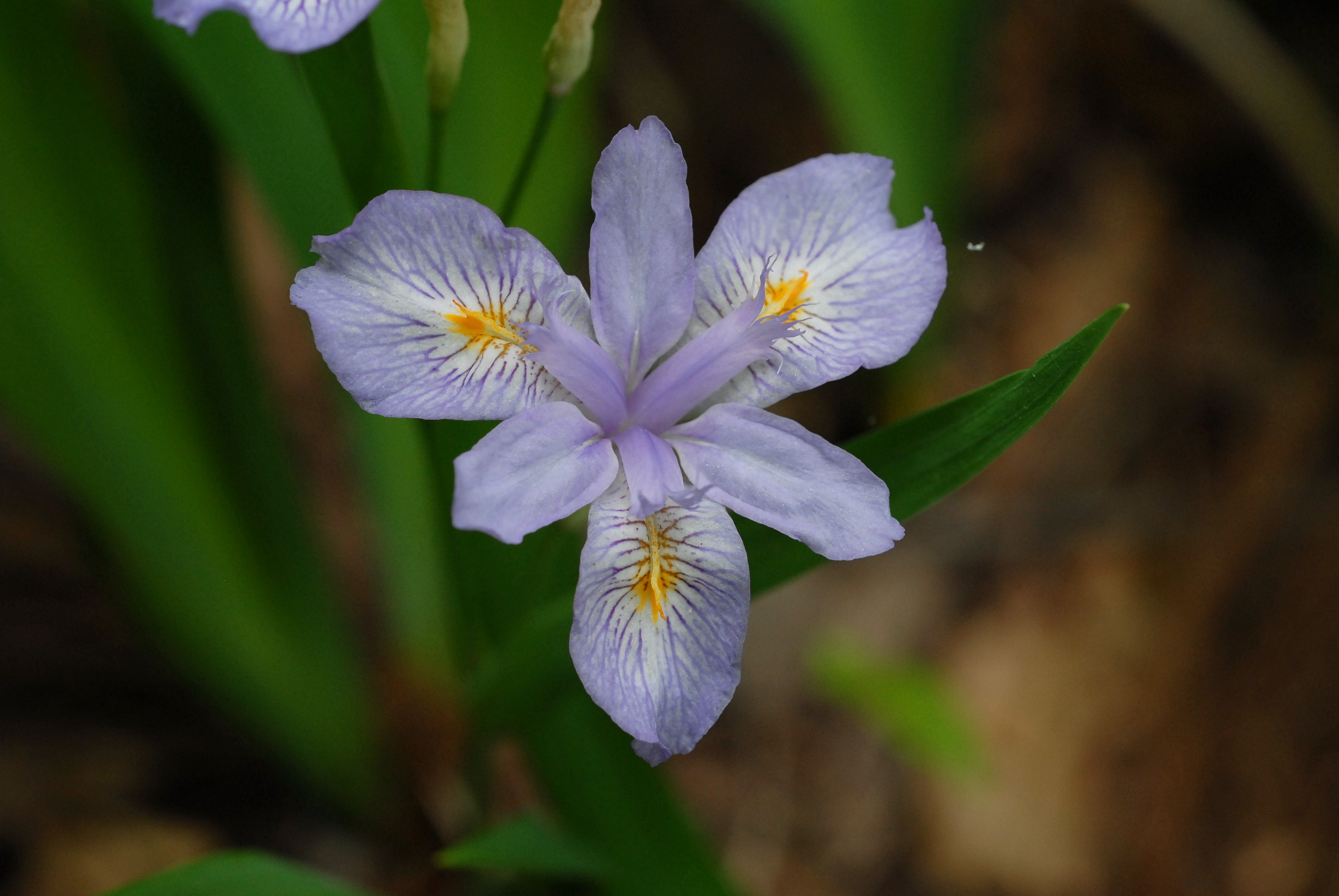
- Close-up of flower
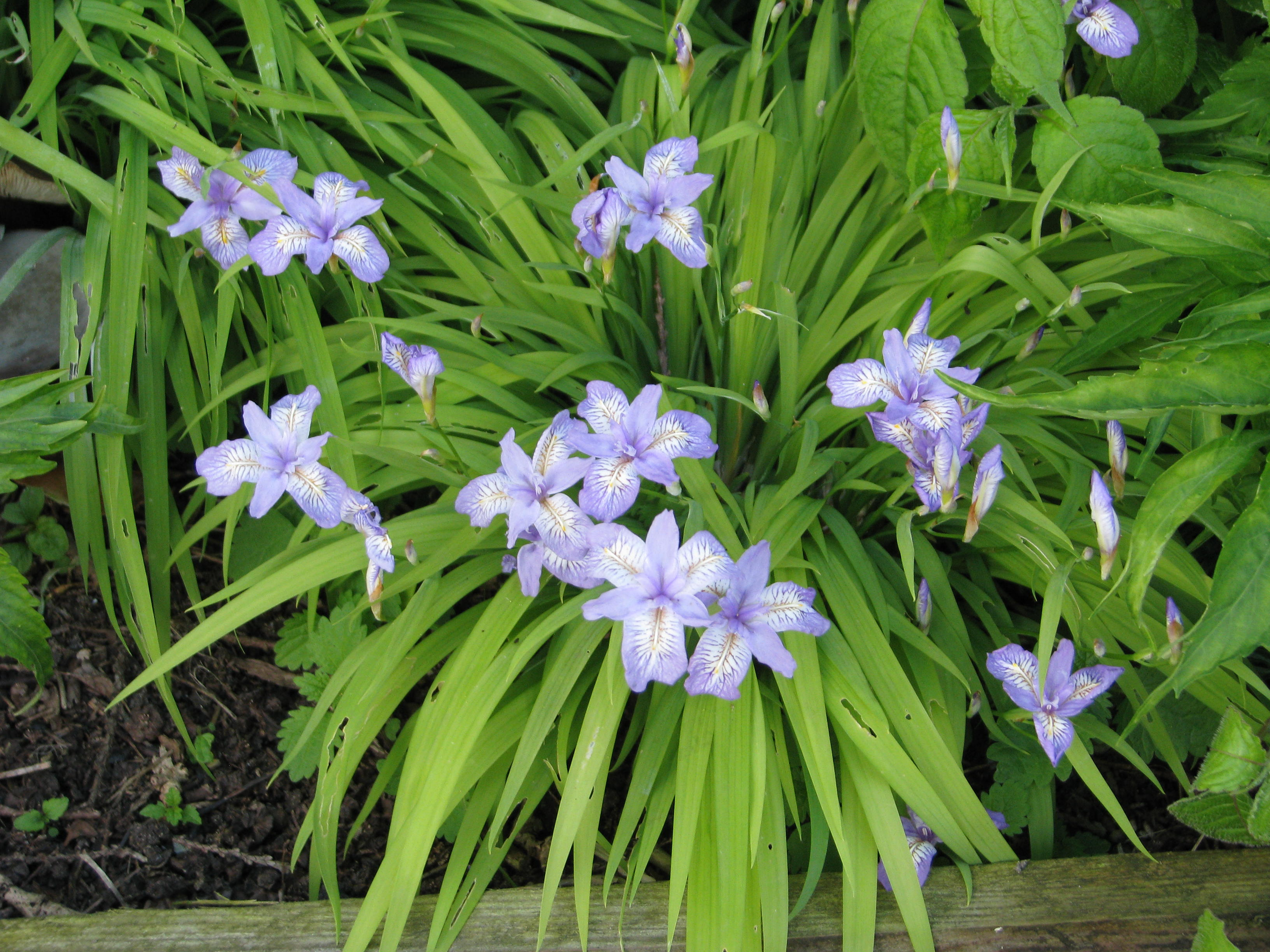
- In a garden setting

Scientific classification
- Kingdom: Plantae
- Clade: Tracheophytes
- Clade: Angiosperms
- Clade: Monocots
- Order: Asparagales
- Family: Iridaceae
- Genus: Iris
- Species: I. gracilipes

Binomial name
- Iris gracilipes A.Gray

Synonyms
- Evansia gracilipes (A.Gray) Klatt; Rodionenkoa gracilipes (A.Gray) M.B.Crespo, Mart.-Azorín & Mavrodiev

= Iris gracilipes =

Species of plant

Iris gracilipes is a species of flowering plant in the family Iridaceae. It is native to Japan. A rhizomatous geophyte, it is typically found in deciduous forests. Currently called ヒメシャガ (hime-shaga; princess iris), it is a candidate for the legendary ハナカツミ or はながつみ (hana-katsumi) plant mentioned in ancient Japanese poetry, including in the Man'yōshū.
