= Iris serotina =

Conservation status
- Data Deficient (IUCN 3.1)

Scientific classification
- Kingdom: Plantae
- Clade: Embryophytes
- Clade: Tracheophytes
- Clade: Spermatophytes
- Clade: Angiosperms
- Clade: Monocots
- Order: Asparagales
- Family: Iridaceae
- Genus: Iris
- Subgenus: Iris subg. Xiphium
- Section: Iris sect. Xiphium
- Species: I. serotina

Binomial name
- Iris serotina Willk.

Synonyms
- Iris cuatrecasasii Font Quer; Iris variabilis subsp. serotina (Willk.) K.Richt.; Xiphion serotinum (Willk.) Soják

Species of flowering plant

Iris serotina is a species in the genus Iris, it is also in the subgenus Xiphium. It is a bulbous perennial from southern Europe, found in Spain and Morocco.

== Description ==
Iris serotina grows to a maximum height of 60 cm (24 in) tall and the narrow leaves are 2–6 mm wide and grow between 30–60 cm (12–24 in) tall. They appear in the autumn, but then fade before flowering.

It normally has 2 - 3 flowers per stem, and generally blooms in late July, or August.

Like other irises, it has 2 pairs of petals, 3 large sepals (outer petals), known as the 'falls' and 3 inner, smaller petals (or tepals), known as the 'standards'. It has blue-violet flowers, the petals are veined with a deeper violet colour, and the falls are marked with a yellow patch.

Its seeds are 2–4 mm, yellow and semi-circular.

== Taxonomy ==
The specific epithet serotina, refers to the Latin word, 'serotina' meaning late in flowering.

In 1861, Heinrich Moritz Willkomm described Iris serotina after seeing plants from Province of Jaén (Spain). Originally, he called it Iris filifolia, but this was later corrected to Iris serotina. Then published in 'Prodromus Florae Hispanicae' Vol.1 in 1861. It was later illustrated in Curtis's Botanical Magazine No.733 in 1977.

Iris serotina is an accepted name by the RHS, and it was verified by United States Department of Agriculture and the Agricultural Research Service on 4 April 2003, then updated on 3 December 2004.

== Distribution and habitat ==
Iris serotina is native to temperate areas of Europe.

=== Range ===
Originally found in South eastern Spain. It has been found in Cuenca, Jaen and in the Province of Granada. It also has been found in Rif in Morocco.

=== Habitat ===
It grows on rocks, on the shadow side of the mountains.

== Conservation ==
It is classed as 'Endangered', and was on the 1997 IUCN Red List of Threatened Plants in Spain.

== Cultivation ==
It is best grown in a bulb frame or a very sheltered dry border, in the UK.

== Toxicity ==
Like many other irises, most parts of the plant are poisonous (rhizome and leaves), if mistakenly ingested can cause stomach pains and vomiting. Also handling the plant may cause a skin irritation or an allergic reaction.

== Other sources ==
- Fennane, M. & M. I. Tattou. 1998. Catalogue des plantes vasculaires rares, menacées ou endémiques du Maroc. Bocconea 8:205.
- Maire, R. C. J. E. et al. 1952–. Flore de l'Afrique du Nord. (F Afr Nord)
- Mathew, B. 1981. The Iris. (Iris) 137.
- Tutin, T. G. et al., eds. 1964–1980. Flora europaea. (F Eur)
