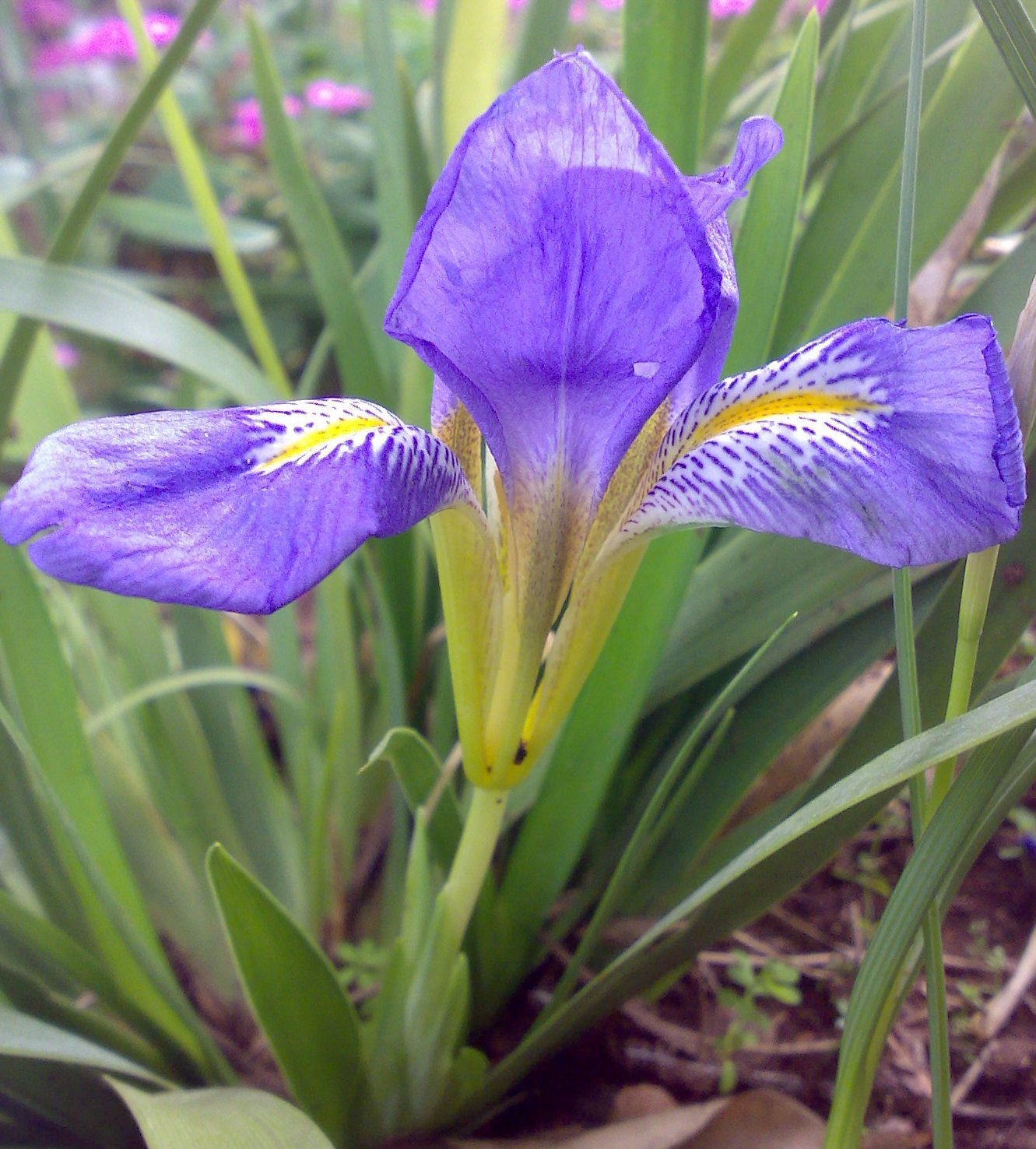

Scientific classification
- Kingdom: Plantae
- Clade: Tracheophytes
- Clade: Angiosperms
- Clade: Monocots
- Order: Asparagales
- Family: Iridaceae
- Genus: Iris
- Subgenus: Iris subg. Limniris
- Section: Iris sect. Limniris
- Series: Iris ser. Unguiculares
- Species: I. lazica

Binomial name
- Iris lazica Albov

= Iris lazica =

Species of flowering plant

Iris lazica, the Lazistan iris, is a species of flowering plant in the family Iridaceae, native to the Black Sea coast of Turkey and Georgia, and also cultivated as an ornamental plant in temperate regions. Growing to 30 cm (12 in) tall, it is a beardless rhizomatous iris with broad evergreen leaves, producing stemless flowers which are shorter in stature than the foliage, and which appear in late winter or early spring. The flower colour is typically pale lilac. Exceptionally for an iris in its group, this species prefers moist conditions and will tolerate some shade.

Iris lazica has gained the Royal Horticultural Society's Award of Garden Merit.
