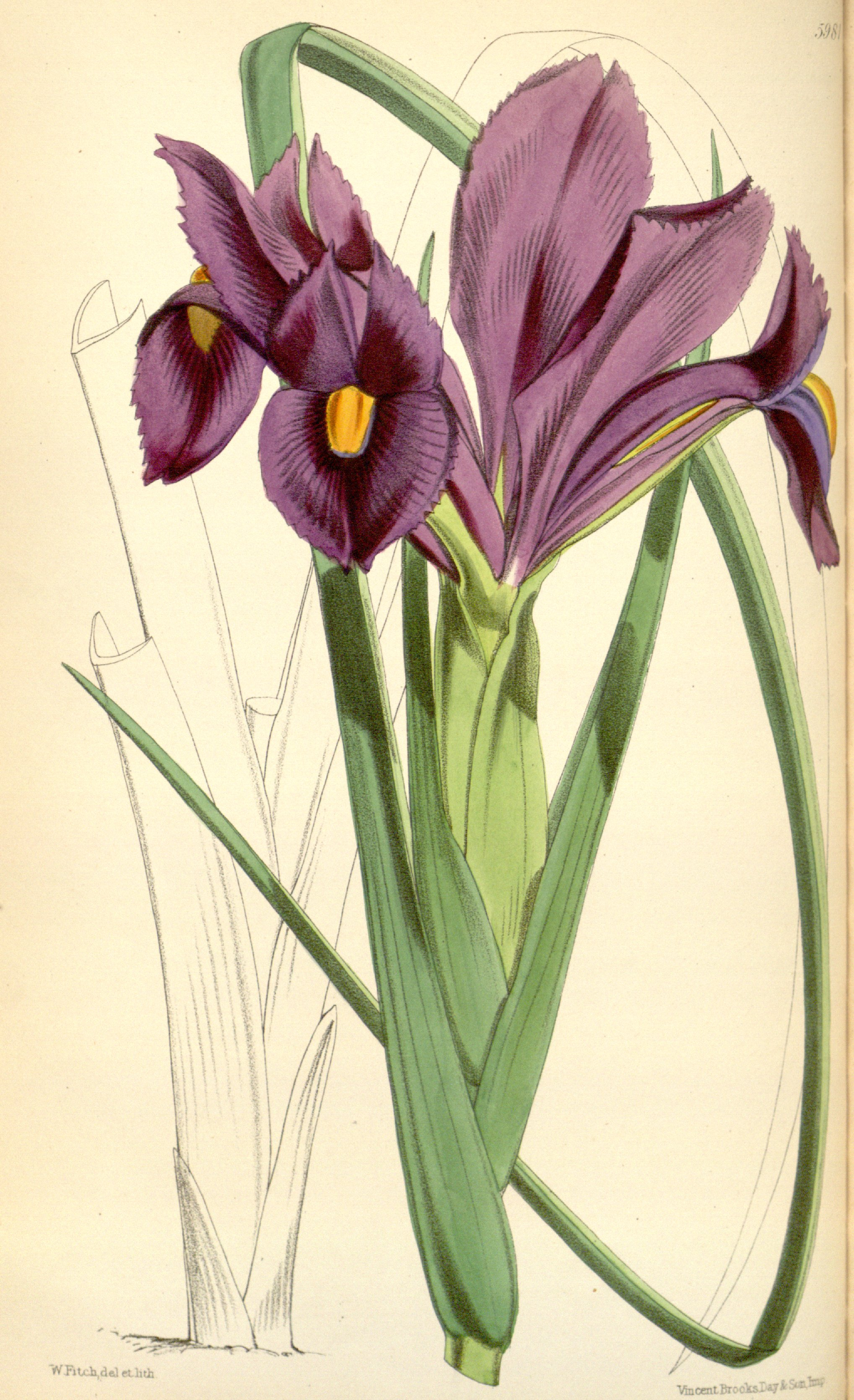

Conservation status
- Least Concern (IUCN 3.1)

Scientific classification
- Kingdom: Plantae
- Clade: Tracheophytes
- Clade: Angiosperms
- Clade: Monocots
- Order: Asparagales
- Family: Iridaceae
- Genus: Iris
- Subgenus: Iris subg. Xiphium
- Section: Iris sect. Xiphium
- Species: I. filifolia

Binomial name
- Iris filifolia Boiss.

Synonyms
- Xiphion filifolium var. latifolium Baker; Xiphion filifolium Boiss.; Xiphion tingitanum Hook; Iris praecox

= Iris filifolia =

Species of plant in the family Iridaceae

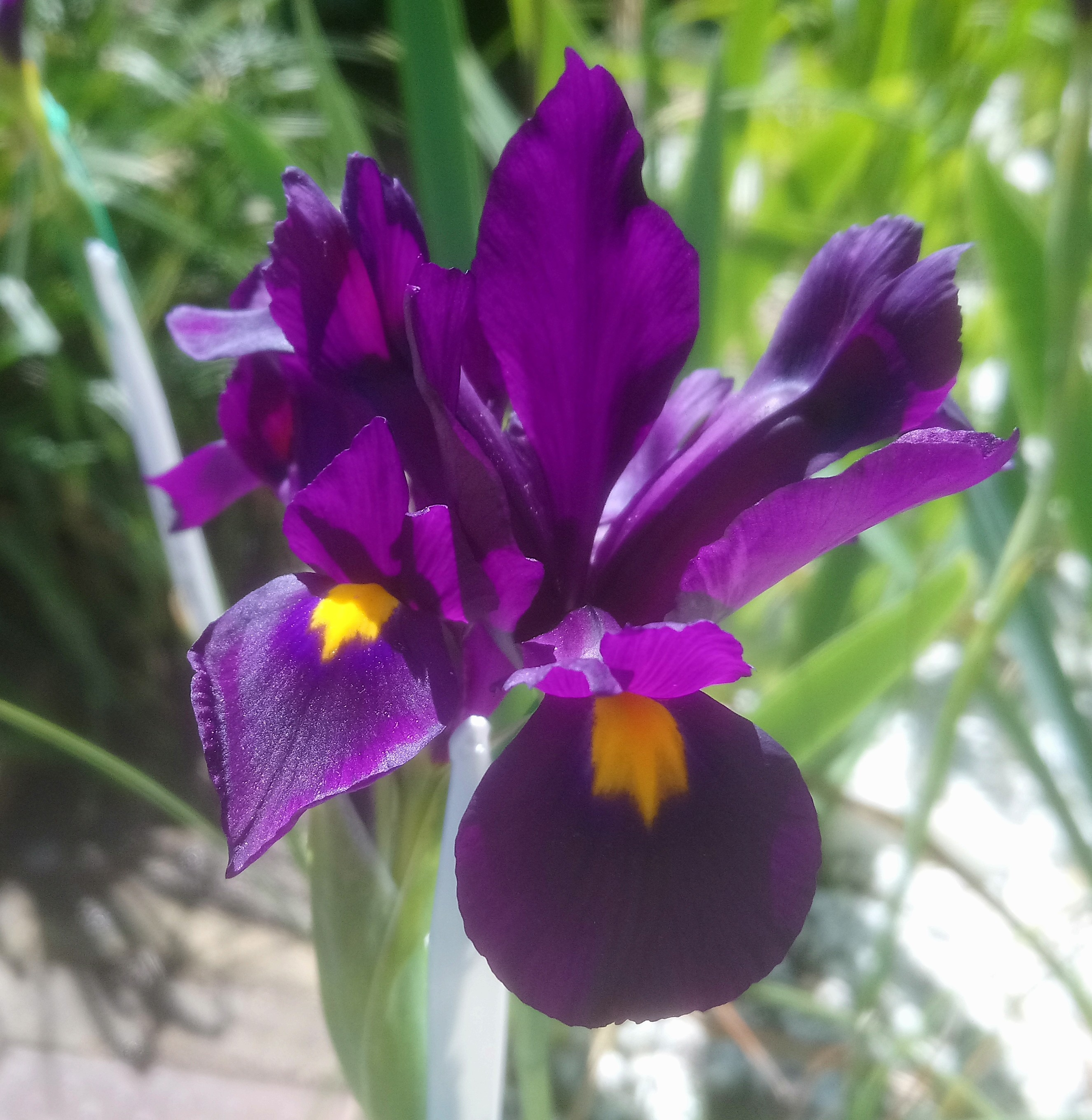
Iris filifolia

Iris filifolia is a species in the genus Iris, it is also in the subgenus Xiphium. It is a bulbous perennial from North Africa and Europe. It has thin leaves, summer flowers in shades of red-purple.

== Description ==
It has 3 mm wide leaves, which appear in the autumn. It normally reaches a height of 10-16 inches (or 25–40 cm). But can reach up to 45 cm tall. It flowers between March and June. Normally more than 2 flowers per stem. When the flowering shoot comes out of the ground it is covered in a purple or white blotched sheath. These then open up to revel red-purple flowers with orange spots, or yellow stripe on the falls.

=== Biochemistry ===
As most irises are diploid, having two sets of chromosomes, this can be used to identify hybrids and classification of groupings. It has a chromosome count: 2n=32.

== Taxonomy ==
Its name means 'thread-leaved iris'.

In Gibraltar, it is also known as the 'Narrow-leaved Purple Iris'.

It is often mistakenly called 'Spanish Iris'. The Spanish Iris is Iris xiphium.

In 1842, it was first described by Pierre Edmond Boissier in 'Voyage botanique en Espagne' Vol 2, on page 602. Dykes notes that this description is incorrect. It was also described in Curtis's Botanical Magazine No.5929 as 'Xiphion filifolium'.

It was recorded in the Catalogue of Life in 2011, and it was verified by United States Department of Agriculture Agricultural Research Service on 4 April 2003, and updated on 14 November 2005.

== Distribution and habitat ==
It is native to temperate regions of North Africa and Europe.

=== Range ===
It was found originally on Sierra de Mijas, and Sierra Bermeja in Spain, at 3,000–4,000 ft (910–1,220 m) above sea level.

It is found within Africa, in Morocco, (near Tangier,) and within Europe, in Southwestern Spain, and in Gibraltar.

=== Habitat ===
Iris filifolia likes to grow in sandy areas.

== Cultivation ==
It is best grown in a bulb frame in the UK.

It is known to be toxic like other bulbs in the genus.

== Cultivars ==
Several known cultivars are;

- 'A. Bloemaard' (dark blue)
- 'Filifolia'
- 'Filifolia Alba'
- 'Filifolia Elizabeth'
- 'Filifolia Imperator'
- 'Filifolia Praecox'
- 'Latifolia'
- 'Queen Of Gazelles'
- 'Rex'

== Hybrids ==
- Iris filifolia var. latifolia (Foster) wide leaved variant
- Iris filifolia var. filifolia (Boiss) and thread-like leaved variant,

== Other sources ==
- Fennane, M. & M. I. Tattou 1998. Catalogue des plantes vasculaires rares, menacées ou endémiques du Maroc (Bocconea) 8:205.
- Jahandiez, E. & R. Maire Catalogue des plantes du Maroc. 1931-1941 (L Maroc)
- Maire, R. C. J. E. et al. Flore de l'Afrique du Nord. 1952- (F Afr Nord)
- Mathew, B. The Iris. 1981 (Iris) 136.
- Tutin, T. G. et al., eds. Flora europaea. 1964-1980 (F Eur)
