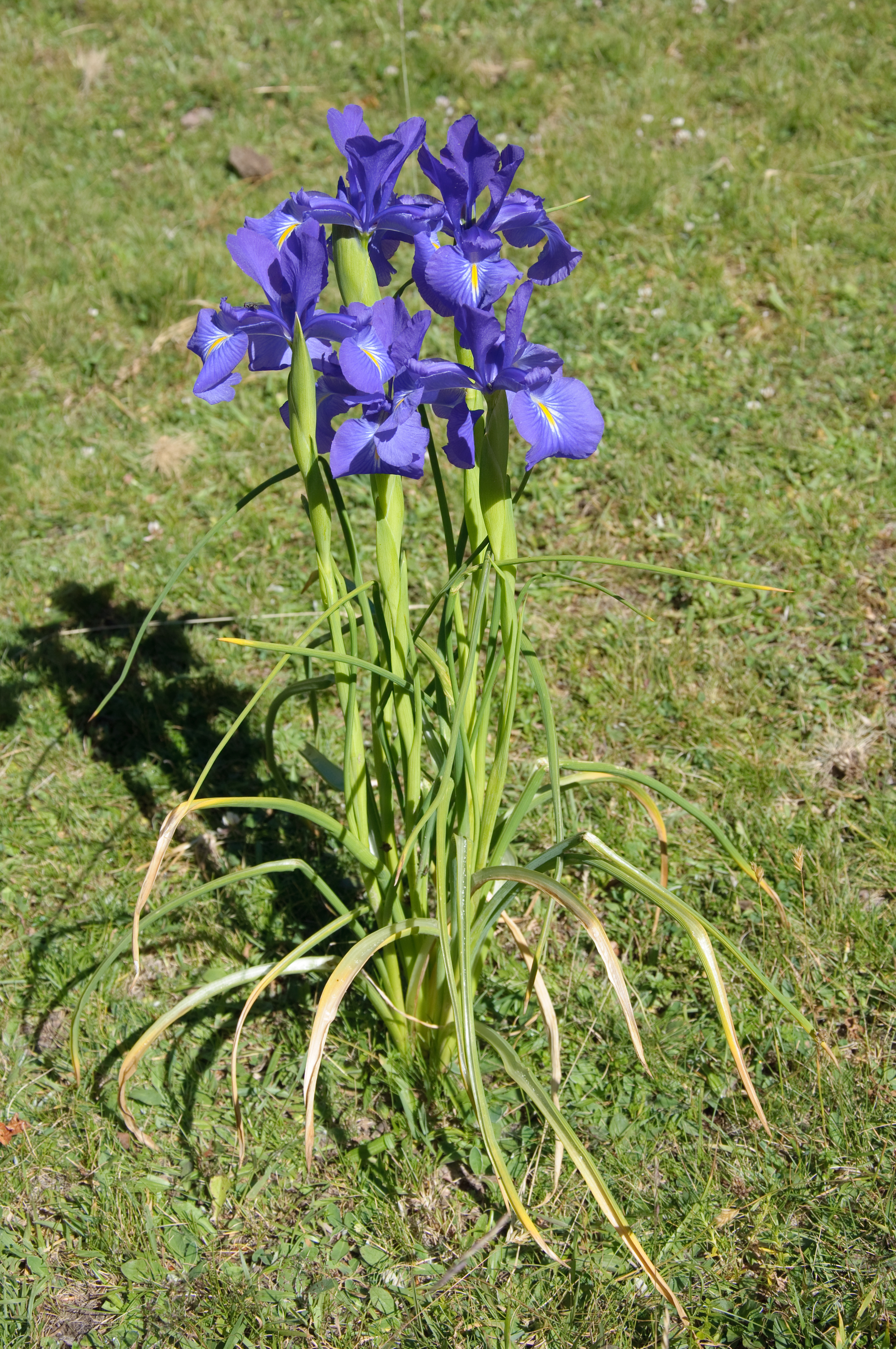
- Iris latifolia, general view

Scientific classification
- Kingdom: Plantae
- Clade: Tracheophytes
- Clade: Angiosperms
- Clade: Monocots
- Order: Asparagales
- Family: Iridaceae
- Genus: Iris
- Subgenus: Iris subg. Xiphium
- Section: Iris sect. Xiphium
- Species: I. latifolia

Binomial name
- Iris latifolia (Mill.) Voss

Synonyms
- Iris anglica Steud. [Invalid]; Iris argentea auct.; Iris cepifolia Stokes; Iris pyrenaica Bubani [Illegitimate]; Iris xiphioides Ehrh.; Xiphion jacquinii Schrank; Xiphion latifolium Mill.

= Iris latifolia =

English iris

Species of flowering plant

Iris latifolia, the English iris, also known as I. xiphiodes and I. anglica, is a hardy flowering bulbous species of the Iris genus, in the family Iridaceae. It is native to the Pyrenees of Southwestern France and Northwestern Spain. It is widely cultivated in temperate regions for its purple flowers which appear in early Summer.

Iris latifolia grows to a height of 50 cm (20 in). The plant produces two or three deep purple flowers with yellow marks in the center of the lower petals. Flowers have six tepals and are 12–13 cm (4.7–5.1 in) in diameter. Leaves are stiff and sword-shaped, approximately 60 cm (24 in) long, and dark green to teal in color. Leaves begin growth in early spring, before the snow has entirely melted. It is a bulbous iris, as opposed to a rhizomatous iris. The bulb has a thin, dark brown skin and grows 10–15 cm (3.9–5.9 in) deep in the ground.

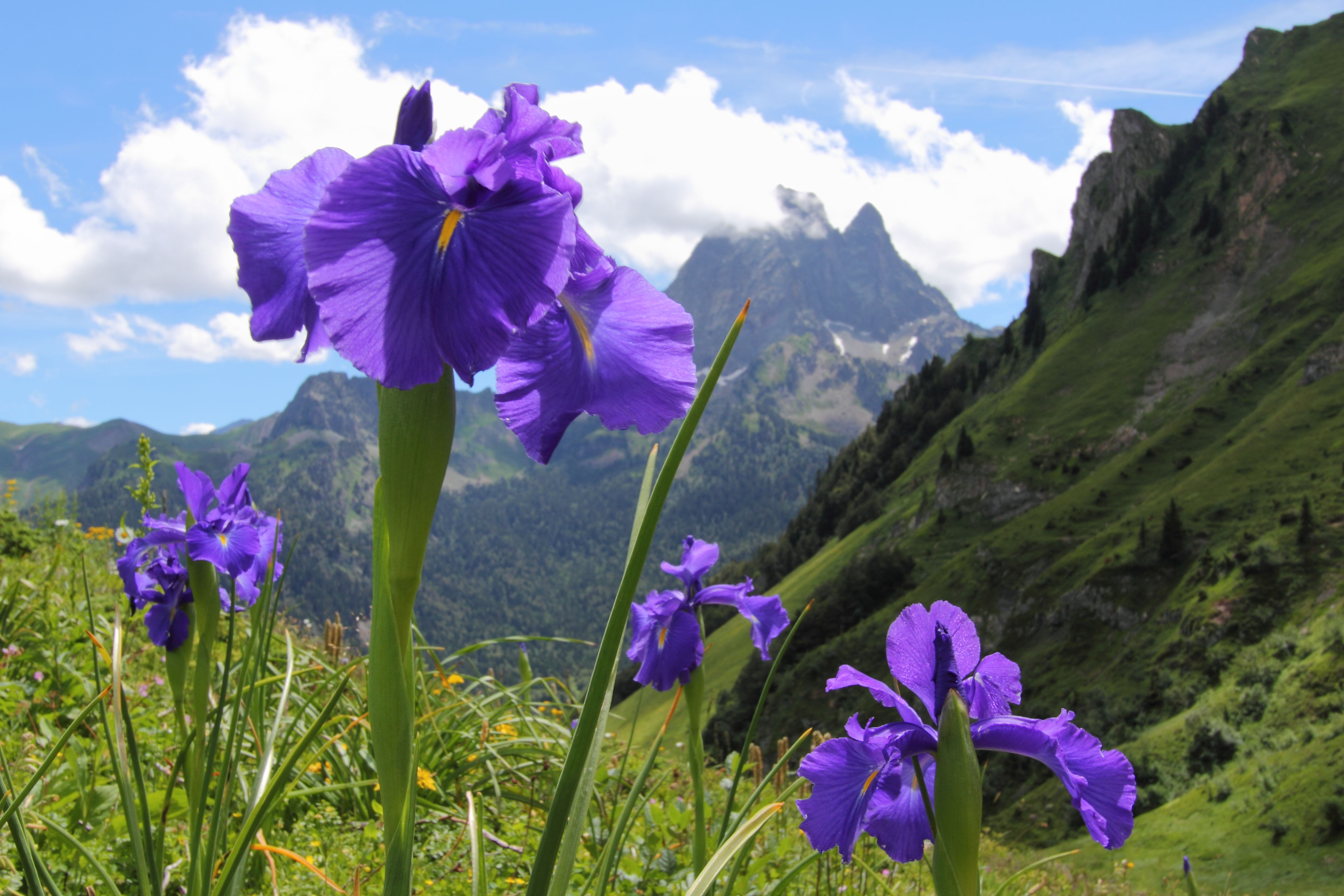
In situ view from the Pyrénées

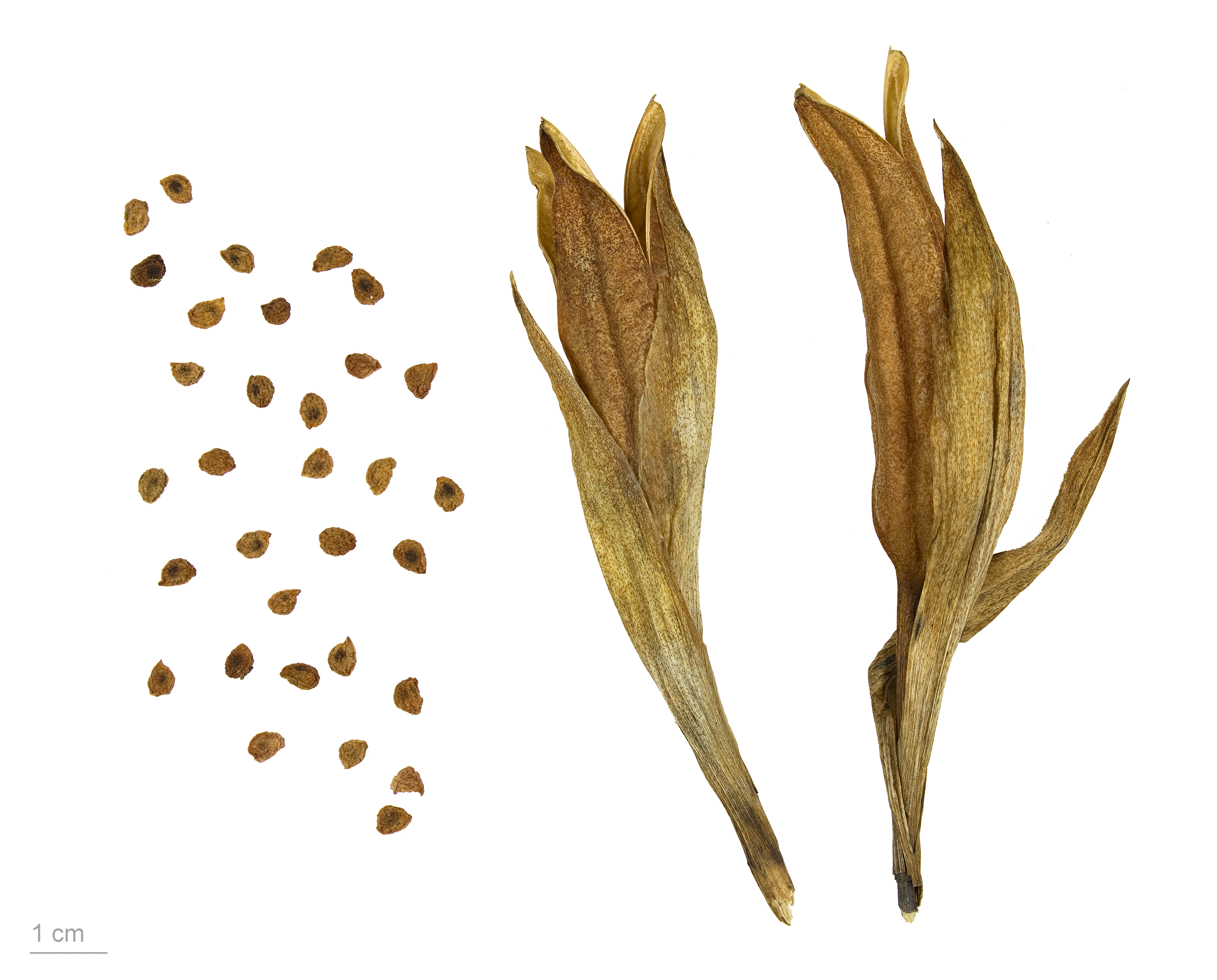
Seeds – MHNT
