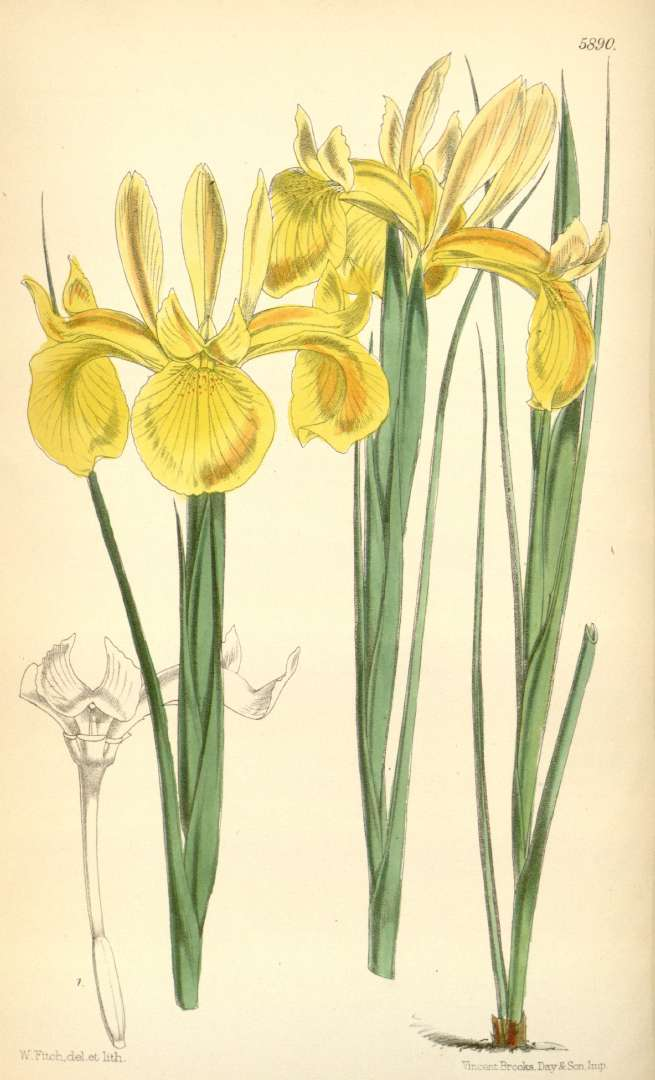
- Illustration of the Iris juncea by Walter Hood Fitch (Curtis’s Botanical Magazine)

Scientific classification
- Kingdom: Plantae
- Clade: Tracheophytes
- Clade: Angiosperms
- Clade: Monocots
- Order: Asparagales
- Family: Iridaceae
- Genus: Iris
- Subgenus: Iris subg. Xiphium
- Section: Iris sect. Xiphium
- Species: I. juncea

Binomial name
- Iris juncea Poir.

Synonyms
- Diaphane stylosa Salisb. Iris mauritanica Ker Gawl. Xiphion junceum (Poir.) Parl.

= Iris juncea =

Rush iris

Species of flowering plant

Iris juncea (commonly called the rush iris) is a smooth-bulbed bulbous iris species. The name is derived from 'juncea' from the Greek word meaning 'rush-like'.

It was first described by Jean Louis Marie Poiret in 1871. It was then illustrated in Curtis's Botanical Magazine in 1898.

Its flowers are light yellow and fragrant. Normally 2 per stem in summer. It flowers between June and July.

It grows to a height of between 1 and 2 feet. The 3mm wide leaves appear in the autumn and then fade before flowering.

The bulb is reddish-brown in colour.

It can be found in (Algeria and Tunisia) in North Africa, Southern Spain and Sicily.

Other varieties known include;

- iris juncea var. merimieri (Lynch) Sulphur yellow flowers
- iris juncea var. numidica (Anon) lemon-yellow flowers (from Africa)
- iris juncea var. pallida (Lynch) large soft yellow flowers
