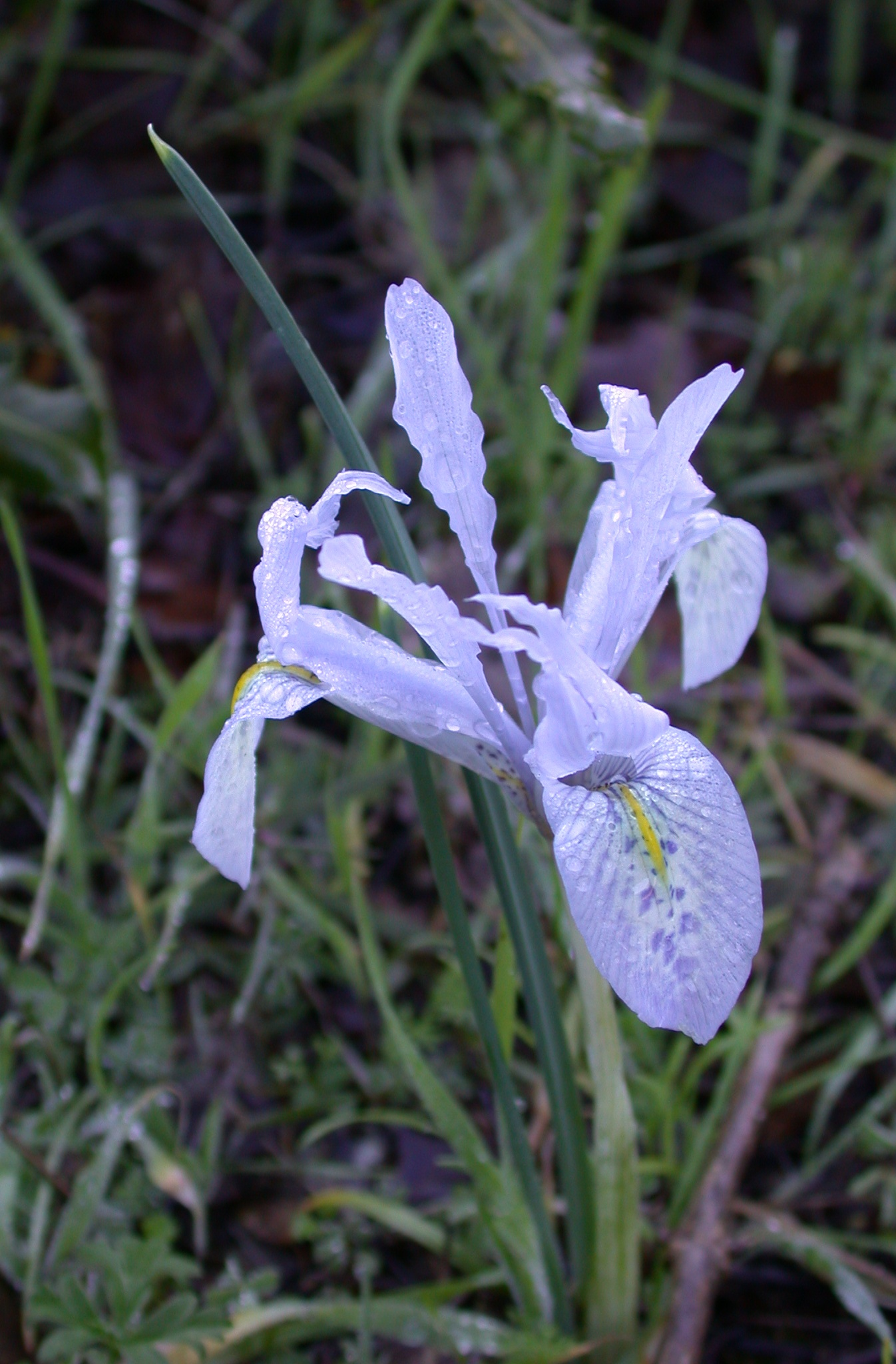

Conservation status
- Least Concern (IUCN 3.1)

Scientific classification
- Kingdom: Plantae
- Clade: Embryophytes
- Clade: Tracheophytes
- Clade: Spermatophytes
- Clade: Angiosperms
- Clade: Monocots
- Order: Asparagales
- Family: Iridaceae
- Genus: Iris
- Subgenus: Iris subg. Hermodactyloides
- Section: Iris sect. Reticulatae
- Species: I. histrio

Binomial name
- Iris histrio Rchb.f.

Synonyms
- Iris libani (Reuter); Iris reticulata var. histrio (Foster); Xiphion histrio (Rchb.f); Iridodictyum histrio (Rchb.f.)

= Iris histrio =

Species of flowering plant

Iris histrio, the Syrian iris, is a species in the genus Iris, it is classified in the subgenus Hermodactyloides and section Reticulatae. It is a bulbous perennial from Central Asia: Kyrgyzstan, Israel, Lebanon, Syria and southern Turkey.

It was first collected by Charles Gaillardot in Lebanon in 1854. In 1873, Heinrich Gustav Reichenbach (Rchb.f) wrote about the bulb in his 'Botanische Notizen'. This then joined the subspecies of iris reticulata, which has now been grouped with other under the subgenus of Hermodactyloides.

It is commonly known as the Syrian iris.

Iris histrio is an accepted name by the RHS.

It has baby blue flowers with intricate markings, shading to purplish blue at the base.

Like other members of the Reticulatae group, such as Iris vartanii and Iris danfordiae, it throws out a very large number of small bulbils round the base of the bulb. If these are planted separately in a reserve ground, they will develop into flowering bulbs in the course of two or three years. Seedlings of I. vartani certainly, and of I. histrio normally needs protection at all times, especially in the UK.

It can grow in loamy soils.

== Native ==
Originally located in Kyrgyzstan. It can also be found in Israel, Lebanon, Syria and as far west as southern Turkey. It's a commonly found plant in Lebanon compared to Iris sofarana and Iris cedreti which are considered to be highly threatened species in Lebanon.

== Subspecies ==
Iris histrio has been separated into two subspecies by Mathew (1989) as subsp. histrio and subsp. aintabensis because of variations in leaf, perigon tube and segment measurements.

Iris histrio subsp. aintabensis has pale smaller blue flowers that are splashed darker on the falls and with a yellow or orange ridge. It is reported to be easier to grow than the species. Also known as Iris histrio var. aintabensis. It was found in the rocky scrublands of southern Turkey, in the Gaziantep-Maras region.

Iris histrio subsp. atropurpurea (Dykes) has purple flowers but with no markings on the falls. Found in 1913. This is now thought, to be a synonym of Iris reticulata var. reticulata.

== Other sources ==
- Czerepanov, S. K. 1995. Vascular plants of Russia and adjacent states (the former USSR).
- Komarov, V. L. et al., eds. 1934–1964. Flora SSSR.
- Mathew, B. 1981. The Iris. 179.
