= Allium jesdianum =

Scientific classification
- Kingdom: Plantae
- Clade: Embryophytes
- Clade: Tracheophytes
- Clade: Spermatophytes
- Clade: Angiosperms
- Clade: Monocots
- Order: Asparagales
- Family: Amaryllidaceae
- Subfamily: Allioideae
- Genus: Allium
- Subgenus: Allium subg. Melanocrommyum
- Species: A. jesdianum

Binomial name
- Allium jesdianum Boiss. & Buhse

Species of flowering plant

Allium jesdianum is a species of onion found mainly in Iran, with populations in Afghanistan and possibly Iraq and Uzbekistan. It is cultivated around the world as an ornamental. Its 'Akbulak' and 'Early Emperor' cultivars gained the Royal Horticultural Society's Award of Garden Merit in 2016, and are also considered by them as good plants to attract pollinators. It has been incorrectly listed for sale by commercial nurseries as Allium rosenbachianum.

== Description ==
A handsome plant growing to about 75 cm (30 in) tall, with strap-like leaves and usually only one many-flowered globose umbel borne on an upright scape. The flowers have prominent white stamens projecting beyond the rose-purple slender petals. A wider variety of petal colors can be found in the many cultivars.

The cultivars 'Akbulak' and 'Early Emperor' have won the Royal Horticultural Society's Award of Garden Merit.
