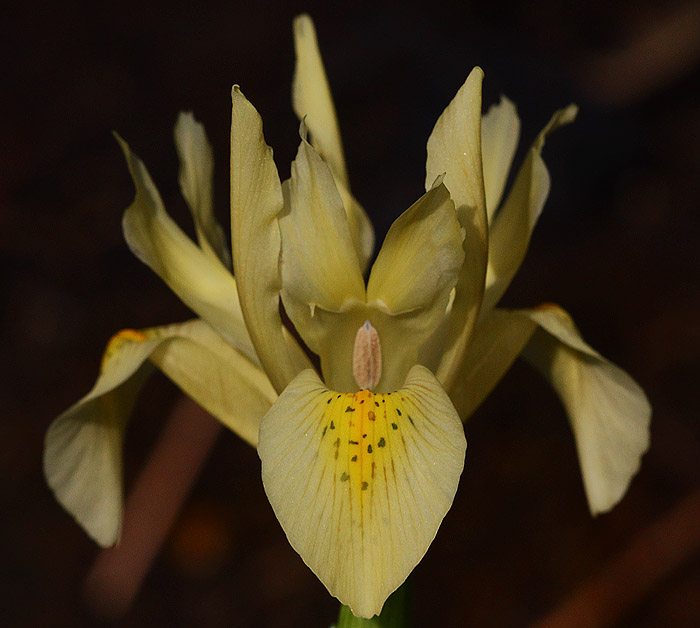

Scientific classification
- Kingdom: Plantae
- Clade: Tracheophytes
- Clade: Angiosperms
- Clade: Monocots
- Order: Asparagales
- Family: Iridaceae
- Genus: Iris
- Subgenus: Iris subg. Hermodactyloides
- Section: Iris sect. Reticulatae
- Species: I. winogradowii

Binomial name
- Iris winogradowii (Fomin)

Synonyms
- Iridodictyum winogradowii (Fomin) Rodion.

= Iris winogradowii =

Species of flowering plant

Iris winogradowii is a species of flowering plant in the genus Iris, classified in the subgenus Hermodactyloides and section Reticulatae. It is a bulbous perennial, from the Caucasus mountains of Azerbaijan and Georgia.

== Description ==
It has pale primrose yellow flowers, with green spots on the falls, the scented flowers are up 5 cm tall and emerge between April and May. With stem and flower the plant reaches a height of 10–15 cm. The leaves emerge after flowering and grow up to 30–40 cm. It has between 2–4 leaves each growing season.

== Taxonomy ==
It is sometimes known from the common name of Wingradoff's iris.

It was named after P.Z. Winogradow-Nikitin who first described it.

It was first found in 1914 and then published and described by Aleksandr Vasiljevich Fomin in 'Schedule Herb Flora Caucasus'. Vol.4 on page 88 in 1914.

An illustration was seen in 1961 in the 'Collins Guide to Bulbs'. It was grown in Australia from seed provided by the Komarov Botanical Institute in St. Petersburg in 1972.

It was verified by United States Department of Agriculture and the Agricultural Research Service on 4 April 2003, then updated on 1 December 2004.

Iris winogradowii is an accepted name by the RHS. The iris later gained the RHS's Award of Garden Merit.

== Distribution and habitat ==
It is native to temperate Asia.

=== Range ===
It is found in Azerbaijan and Georgia.

In 1972, Dr Rodionenko noted that several hundred iris plants were on Mount Lomtismta near Bakuriani, (in Georgia).

=== Habitat ===
In 1914, it was originally found in the gravelly soils of the alpine meadows of Mount Lomtismta. Part of the Caucasus regions of Adzharo-Imeretinskiy Range.

== Conservation ==
The plant is now on the 'endangered' list. Now only found in the republics of Georgia and Abkhazia. Only a couple of hundred plants existed in 1978. In the Caucasus mountains, it is at risk of extinction due to the over-collection of the flowers and bulbs.

== Cultivation ==
It was first grown in the UK in 1923.

Due to its alpine origins, it prefers to grow in semi-shade in cool peat enriched soils.

It is normally grown in a rock garden, alpine house or bulb frame. In gardens it prefers humus-rich, porous soil in cool shade and does best if replanted each year after a fairly dry summer.

It has been remarked that this species is difficult to grow in a pot.

== Cultivars ==
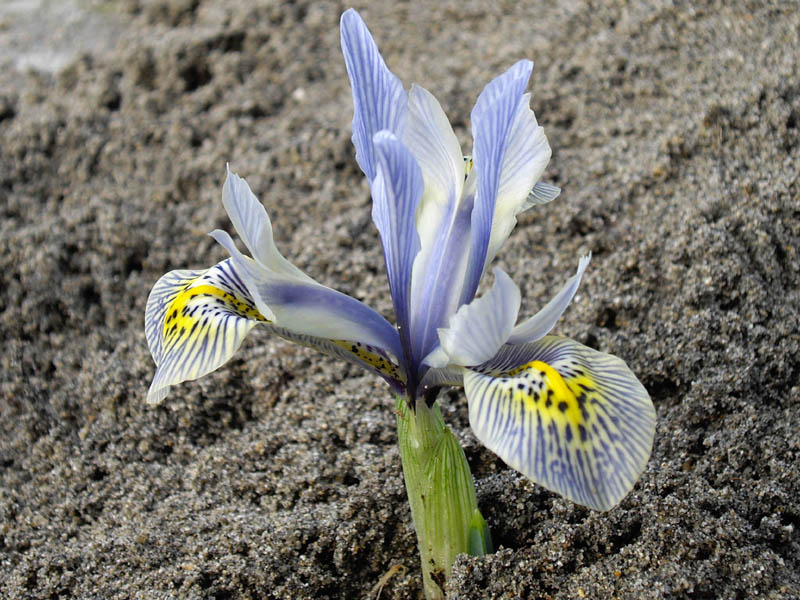
Iris 'Katharine Hodgkin'

In 1960, E.B. Anderson created the hybrid of Iris histrioides and Iris winogradowii. He then named the plant after the wife of a fellow enthusiast, Eliot Hodgkin (mother of Sir Gordon Howard Eliot Hodgkin). Iris Katharine Hodgkin has light blue standards and pale yellow falls.

Iris 'Sheila Ann Germaney' is another hybrid between Iris histrioides and Iris winogradowii. It is similar to 'Katherine Hodgkin', with a paler blue tone and less yellow colouring.

Iris 'Frank Elder' is a white form hybrid.

== Other sources ==
- Czerepanov, S. K. 1995. Vascular plants of Russia and adjacent states (the former USSR).
- Komarov, V. L. et al., eds. 1934–1964. Flora SSSR.
- Mathew, B. 1981. The Iris. 179.
