= Hymenostegia talbotii =

Conservation status
- Critically Endangered (IUCN 2.3)

Scientific classification
- Kingdom: Plantae
- Clade: Tracheophytes
- Clade: Angiosperms
- Clade: Eudicots
- Clade: Rosids
- Order: Fabales
- Family: Fabaceae
- Genus: Hymenostegia
- Species: H. talbotii

Binomial name
- Hymenostegia talbotii Baker f.

Species of legume

Hymenostegia talbotii is a species of plant in the family Fabaceae. It is found only in Nigeria. It is threatened by habitat loss.
