= Iris zagrica =

Scientific classification
- Kingdom: Plantae
- Clade: Tracheophytes
- Clade: Angiosperms
- Clade: Monocots
- Order: Asparagales
- Family: Iridaceae
- Genus: Iris
- Subgenus: Iris subg. Hermodactyloides
- Section: Iris sect. Reticulatae
- Species: I. zagrica

Binomial name
- Iris zagrica B.Mathew and Zarrei

Species of flowering plant

Iris zagrica is a species in the genus Iris, in the subgenus Hermodactyloides and section Reticulatae. It is a bulbous perennial plant.

It was described by botanical authors Brian Mathew and Mehdi Zarrei in 2009, who published their findings in Curtis's Botanical Magazine volume 26(3), pages 245–252, table 653.

Its name was verified in the US in 2003, by ARS Systematic Botanists

It was named after the Zagros Mountains in Iran.

In 2010, it was exhibited at the RHS London Early Spring Show by a Director of Kew. It was awarded a Botanical Certificate by the Joint Rock Garden Plant Committee of the Alpine Garden Society.

== Habit ==
It has a long icy blue flower stalk and a very short tube. The blue standards have a darker central zone. The falls are powerfully veined, imperial purple, with an orange central crest.

Some rare versions have pure white flowers.

Kew Gardens has a bulb originally collected in 08/05/1962 from the 'Zirreh Pass' in Iran, it was originally named Iris reticulata before being reclassified.

== Native ==
Originating from and named after the Zagros, a mountain range in western Iran. It can also be found in Iraq. It can be found as high as almost 2000m above sea level.
