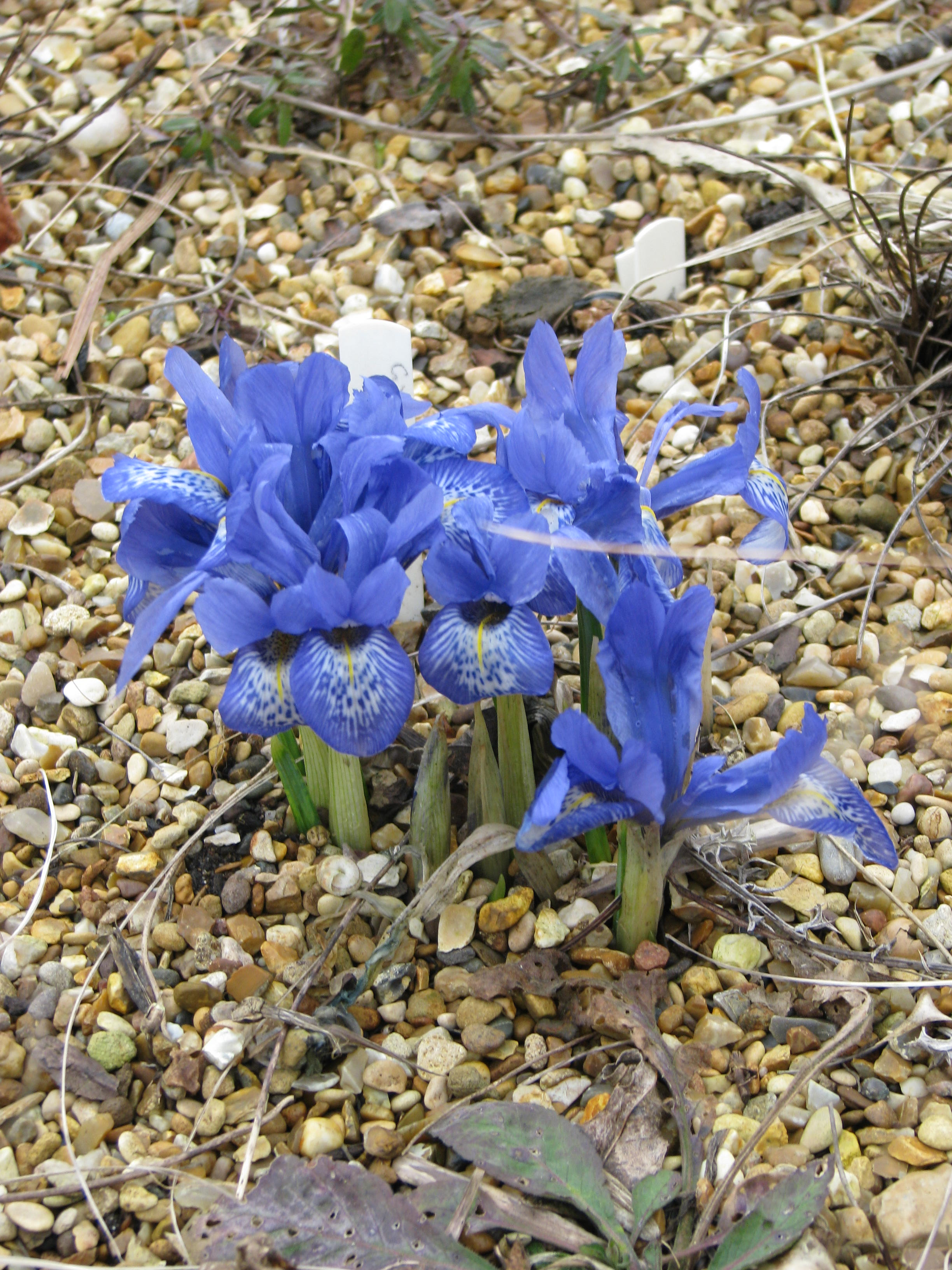
- Cultivar 'Lady Beatrix Stanley'

Scientific classification
- Kingdom: Plantae
- Clade: Tracheophytes
- Clade: Angiosperms
- Clade: Monocots
- Order: Asparagales
- Family: Iridaceae
- Genus: Iris
- Subgenus: Iris subg. Hermodactyloides
- Section: Iris sect. Reticulatae
- Species: I. histrioides

Binomial name
- Iris histrioides (G.F. Wilson) S. Arn.

Synonyms
- Iridodictyum histrioides (G.F.Wilson) Nothdurft; Iris histrioides var. sophenensis (Foster) Dykes; Iris reticulata var. histrioides G.F.Wilson; Iris reticulata var. sophenensis Foster

= Iris histrioides =

Species of flowering plant

Iris histrioides, the orchis iris, winter iris or Harput iris, is a species of flowering plant in the genus Iris, subgenus Hermodactyloides of the family Iridaceae. It is a bulbous perennial, that is native to Turkey, and has bluish scented flowers. It is cultivated as a plant for ornamental purposes in temperate regions, and has many known cultivars.

== Description ==
It is similar in form to Iris histrio, but with flowers a deeper shade of blue, and shorter stem.

It has bulbs which are coated with a solid brown fibrous network.

It has leaves that grow up to 40–50 cm (16–20 in) high, and are squarish in cross section, thicker than in other Reticulatas. They appear after the flowers have bloomed or sometimes as they open.

It has a very very short stem.

The flower is about 6–7 cm (2.4–2.8 in) tall.

It blooms in early spring, normally January, or February.

It has flowers that vary in shade from bright blue to violet.

Like other irises, it has 2 pairs of petals, 3 large sepals (outer petals), known as the 'falls' and 3 inner, smaller petals (or tepals), known as the 'standards'. The falls have a yellow signal, with many black spots, also they have a yellow ridge. The flowers can last up to a week on the plant, depending on the weather.

=== Genetics ===
As most irises are diploid, having two sets of chromosomes, this can be used to identify hybrids and classification of groupings. It has been counted several times. Reported chromosome numbers have differed, given as 2n=17 by Randolph & Mitra in 1959, 2n=16 by Johnson & Mathew in 1989, and 2n=16+1B by Johnson & Brandham in 1997.

It is normally stated as 2n=16, or 2n=17.

== Taxonomy ==
It is sometimes known as the 'Orchis Iris', ‘winter iris’, or 'Harput iris', after the Turkish city of Harput.

It was first published as Iris reticulata var. histrioides and described by G.F.Wilson in Gardeners' Chronicles ser.3 Vol.9 n page 117 in 1891. In 1892, in the 'Journal of Horticulture' Vol.III Issue 24 on page 121, Samuel Arnott republished it as Iris histrioides.

The specific epithet histrioides, refers to resembling Iris histrio.

Iris histrioides was verified by United States Department of Agriculture and the Agricultural Research Service on 3 April 2003, then updated on 1 December 2004.

== Distribution and habitat ==
It is native to Europe.

=== Range ===
It is found in Asia minor, or Turkey, near Amasya.

=== Habitat ===
It commonly grows on the mountain slopes, within pine forests, at an altitude of 1,500 metres (4,900 ft) above sea level.

== Conservation ==
It was on the 1997 IUCN Red List of Threatened Plants.

== Cultivation ==
It is a hardy species, to between USDA Zone: 5 - 8. It is hardier than Iris histrio. But be planted in well-drained soils, to protect from summer rains, which will rot the bulb.

It is suitable for a rock or gravel garden or front of border. It likes rocky soils that dry out completely in summer.

Once the bulb has been planted, it can take many years to reach flowering size. Also it has the habit of the main bulb splitting into many bulblets, that can take many years to reach flowering size.

Grows well outside but also good in the alpine house. This species is represented in cultivation by several cultivars.

== Cultivars known ==
- Iris 'Angel Tears' (blue with a honey mark on white ground with a small yellow vein),
- Iris 'George' (purple),
- Iris 'Katharine Hodgkin'(light blue standards, pale yellow falls, a 1960s hybrid of Iris histrioides and the primrose-yellow Iris winogradowii),
- Iris 'Harmony' (light blue, a hybrid between I. histrioides and Iris reticulata),
- Iris 'Joyce' (deep blue falls and sky blue standards),
- Iris 'Lady Beatrice Stanley' (dark blue or pale-blue flowers and a mass of dark spotting on the falls),
- Iris 'Major' (royal blue),
- Iris 'Pauline' (light blue, a hybrid between I. histrioides and I. reticulata),
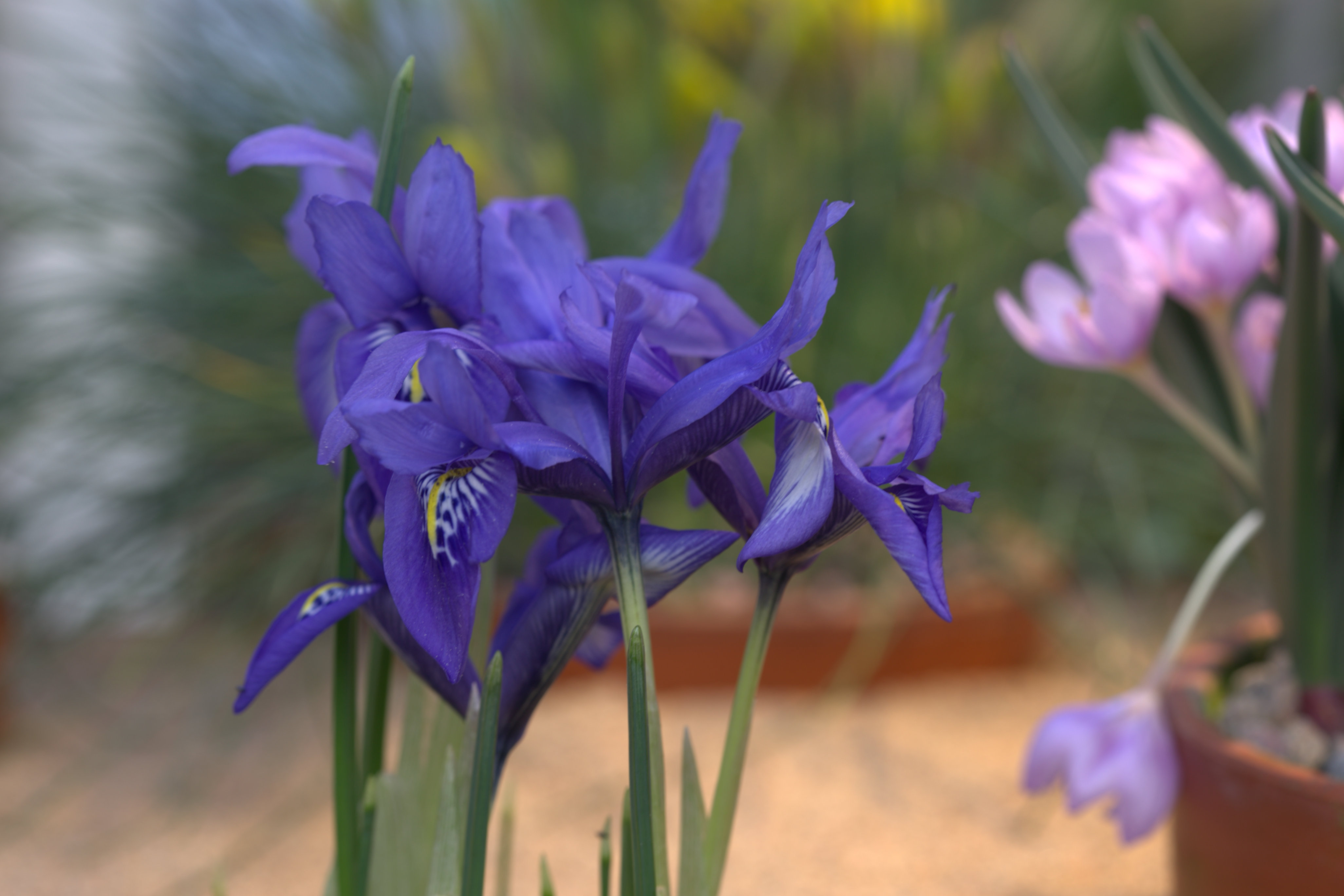
Iris histrioides f. major

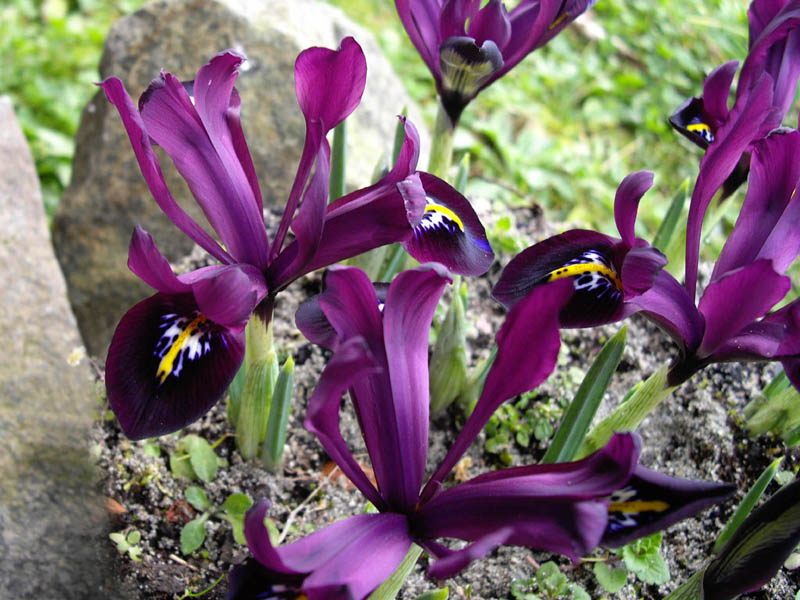
Variety 'Gerorge'

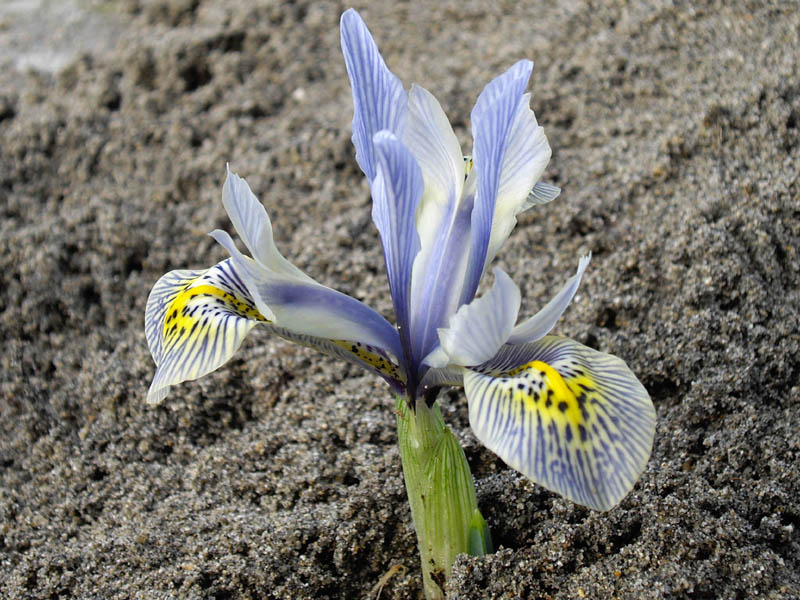
Variety 'Katharine Hodgkin'

== Subspecies ==
- Iris histrioides var. sophenensis also, from Turkey is deep violet-blue with little veining or spotting, narrow petals and a yellow ridge.

== Toxicity ==
Like many other irises, most parts of the plant are poisonous (rhizome and leaves), if mistakenly ingested can cause stomach pains and vomiting. Also handling the plant may cause a skin irritation or an allergic reaction.

== Uses ==
Iris histrioides and Iris persica L. have been used as food ingredients in Turkey.

== Other sources ==
- Aldén, B., S. Ryman, & M. Hjertson Svensk Kulturväxtdatabas, SKUD (Swedish Cultivated and Utility Plants Database; online resource on www.skud.info). 2012 (Kulturvaxtdatabas)
- Davis, P. H., ed. Flora of Turkey and the east Aegean islands. 1965-1988 (F Turk)
- Mathew, B. The Iris. 1981 (Iris) 175–176.
