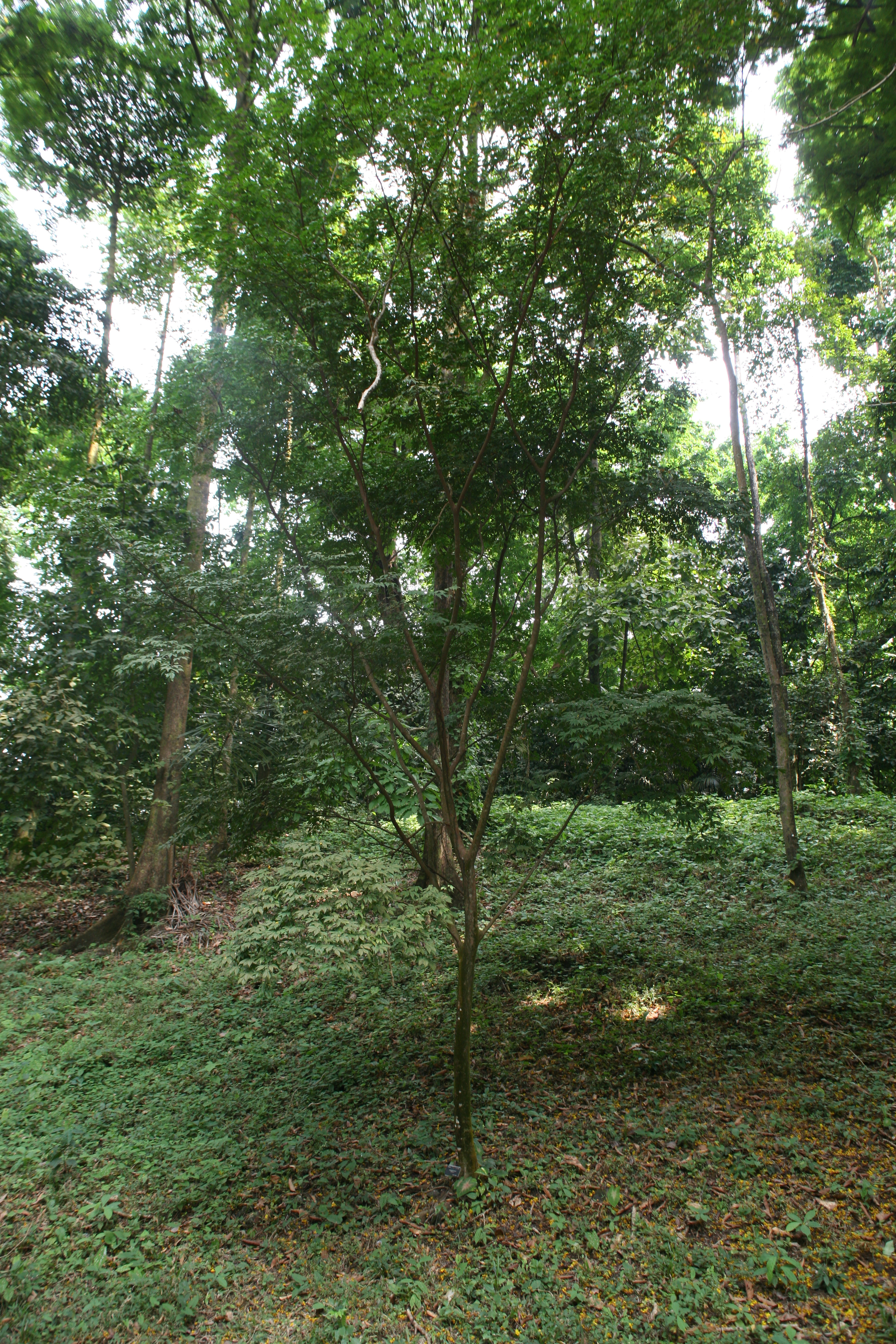
- Hymenostegia

Scientific classification
- Kingdom: Plantae
- Clade: Tracheophytes
- Clade: Angiosperms
- Clade: Eudicots
- Clade: Rosids
- Order: Fabales
- Family: Fabaceae
- Subfamily: Detarioideae
- Tribe: Amherstieae
- Genus: Hymenostegia; Harms (1897)

Synonyms
- Dipetalanthus A. Chev. (1946)

= Hymenostegia =

Genus of legumes

Hymenostegia is a genus of flowering plants in the family Fabaceae. It includes 14 species native to west and west-central tropical Africa.

The genus is not well defined. Several species probably do not belong, and some have been moved to other genera.

== Species ==
14 species are accepted:

- Hymenostegia aubrevillei Pellegr.
- Hymenostegia bakeriana Hutch. & Dalziel
- Hymenostegia brachyura (Harms) J.Léonard
- Hymenostegia elegans Wieringa & Mackinder
- Hymenostegia felicis (A.Chev.) J.Léonard
- Hymenostegia floribunda (Benth.) Harms
- Hymenostegia gracilipes Hutch. & Dalziel
- Hymenostegia klainei Pierre ex Pellegr.
- Hymenostegia mundungu (Pellegr.) J.Léonard
- Hymenostegia neoaubrevillei J.Léonard
- Hymenostegia normandii Pellegr.
- Hymenostegia pellegrinii (A.Chev.) J.Léonard
- Hymenostegia robusta Wieringa & Mackinder
- Hymenostegia talbotii Baker f.
- Hymenostegia viridiflora Mackinder & Wieringa
