= Hymenostegia aubrevillei =

Conservation status
- Near Threatened (IUCN 3.1)

Scientific classification
- Kingdom: Plantae
- Clade: Tracheophytes
- Clade: Angiosperms
- Clade: Eudicots
- Clade: Rosids
- Order: Fabales
- Family: Fabaceae
- Genus: Hymenostegia
- Species: H. aubrevillei

Binomial name
- Hymenostegia aubrevillei Pellegr.

Species of legume

Hymenostegia aubrevillei is a medium-sized tree in the family Fabaceae found in riparian habitats. It is endemic to Côte d'Ivoire, Ghana (in the Krokosua Hills and across the Dahomey Gap), and Nigeria. It is threatened by habitat loss by the deforestation, mining and agriculture, as well as fires.
