= Hymenostegia bakeriana =

Conservation status
- Vulnerable (IUCN 2.3)

Scientific classification
- Kingdom: Plantae
- Clade: Embryophytes
- Clade: Tracheophytes
- Clade: Spermatophytes
- Clade: Angiosperms
- Clade: Eudicots
- Clade: Rosids
- Order: Fabales
- Family: Fabaceae
- Genus: Hymenostegia
- Species: H. bakeriana

Binomial name
- Hymenostegia bakeriana Hutch. & Dalziel

Species of legume

Hymenostegia bakeriana is a species of plant in the family Fabaceae. It is found in Cameroon and Nigeria. It is threatened by habitat loss.

== Taxonomy ==
The Latin specific epithet bakeriana is in honor of the English botanist John Gilbert Baker.
