= Hymenostegia gracilipes =

Conservation status
- Endangered (IUCN 2.3)

Scientific classification
- Kingdom: Plantae
- Clade: Tracheophytes
- Clade: Angiosperms
- Clade: Eudicots
- Clade: Rosids
- Order: Fabales
- Family: Fabaceae
- Genus: Hymenostegia
- Species: H. gracilipes

Binomial name
- Hymenostegia gracilipes Hutch. & Dalziel

Species of legume

Hymenostegia gracilipes is a small to medium riparian and rainforest tree in the family Fabaceae. It is endemic to Ghana, where it is threatened by habitat loss due to its growth in primary rainforests, although it is locally common.
