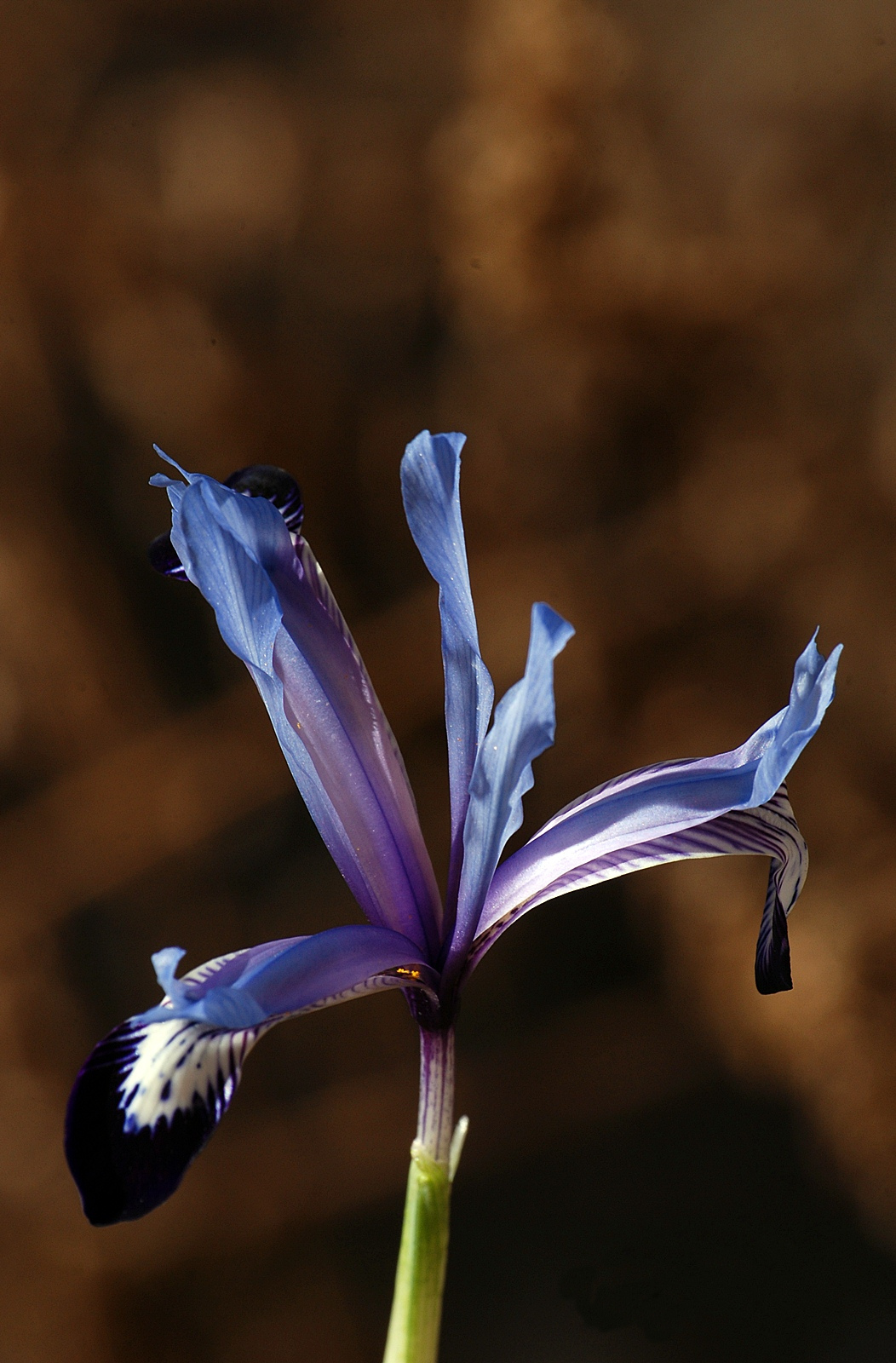

Scientific classification
- Kingdom: Plantae
- Clade: Tracheophytes
- Clade: Angiosperms
- Clade: Monocots
- Order: Asparagales
- Family: Iridaceae
- Genus: Iris
- Section: Iris sect. Reticulatae
- Species: I. reticulata
- Variety: I. r. var. bakeriana

Trinomial name
- Iris reticulata var. bakeriana (Foster) B.Mathew & Wendelbo

Synonyms
- Iridodictyum bakerianum (Foster) Rodion.; Iris bakeriana (Foster); Iris melaina H.R.Wehrh.

= Iris reticulata var. bakeriana =

Variety of flowering plant

Iris reticulata var. bakeriana is a variety of Iris reticulata, a plant in the genus Iris. It is sometimes treated as Iris bakeriana, especially in the USA.

== Description ==
The bulbs are more pointed and slender in shape than other reticulata irises in the genus. It grows to about 10 cm tall, with a 5–6 cm tall flower. It has bluish lilac standards and styles. Falls are white with deep blue tips, lines, and blotches. It also has pale blue veining. This variety of iris has nearly cylindrical leaves unlike other reticulata species. It blooms in early spring, normally February.

=== Biochemistry ===
As most irises are diploid, having two sets of chromosomes, this can be used to identify hybrids and classification of groupings. It has a chromosome count: 2n=20, counted by Johnson & Brandham in 1997.

== Taxonomy ==
The Latin specific epithet reticulata refers to the Latin word for net, and bakeriana is in honor of the English botanist John Gilbert Baker.

It was originally found in Armenia near the city of Mardin(in Turkey).

It was originally described and published by Sir Michael Foster as Iris bakeriana in Curtis's Botanical Magazine, Tab. 7084. on November 1, 1889.

Then in Flora Iranica (1975) it was re-classified to be a variety of Iris reticulata by Wendelbo. This now is accepted by most botanists. Iris bakeriana (Foster) then become a synonym for the plant. Although the United States Department of Agriculture and the Agricultural Research Service still class Iris bakeriana as a true species.

Iris reticulata var. bakeriana is an accepted name by the RHS.

== Distribution and habitat ==
Iris reticulata var. bakeriana is native to the temperate areas of Asia, mainly Iran, Iraq and Turkey. It is found on rocky hillsides, with heavy clay soil.

== Cultivation ==
It is suitable for a rock or gravel garden or front of border. It is hardy between USDA Zones 3–9.

== Cultivars ==
Cultivars regarded as involving I. reticulata var. bakeriana include:

- 'Pauline'
- 'Purple Gem'
- 'Gordon'
- 'Clairette'
- 'Melaina'
- 'Spring Time'

== Other sources ==
- Mathew, B. 1981. The Iris. 173
