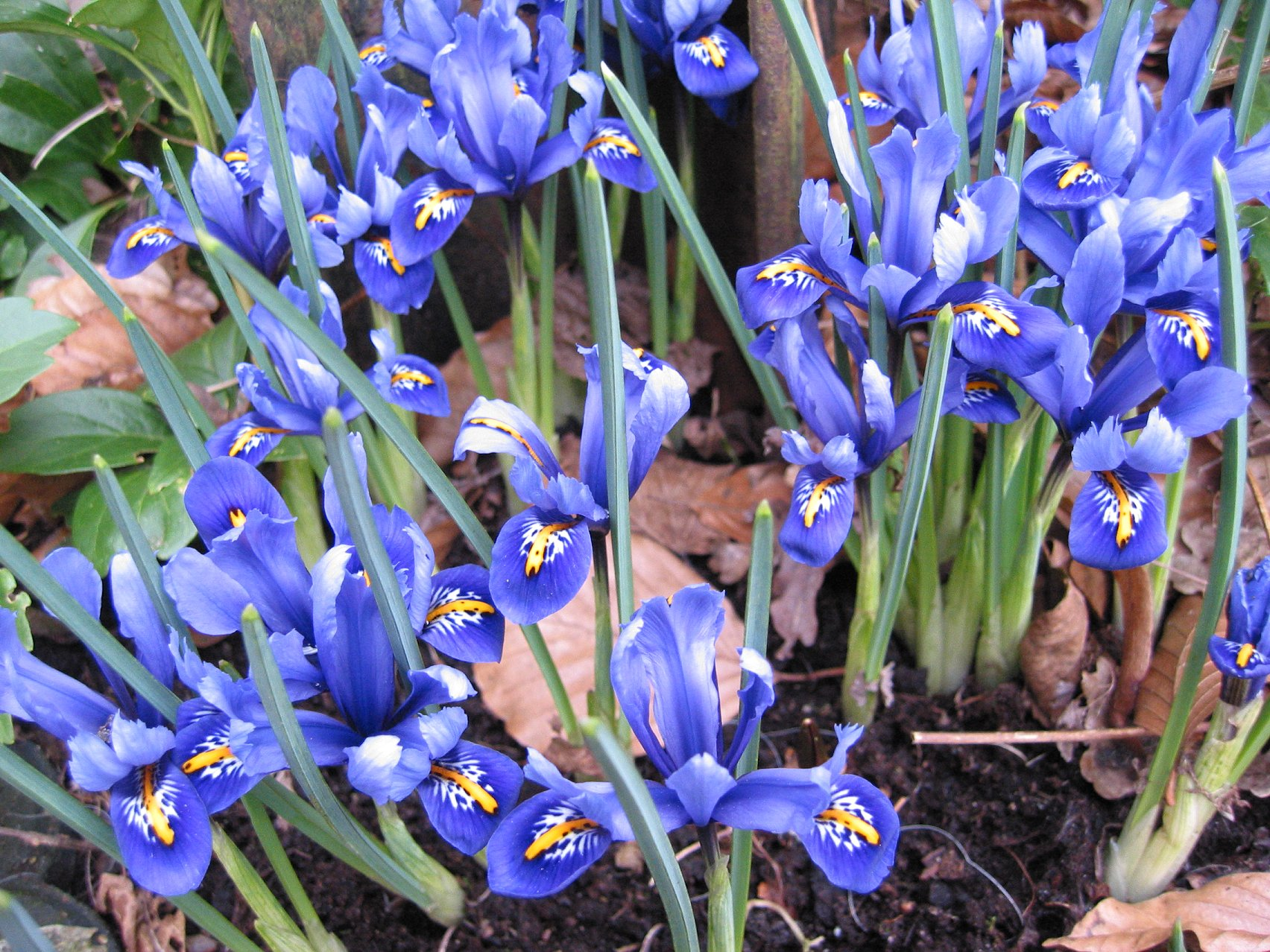
- Iris reticulata

Scientific classification
- Kingdom: Plantae
- Clade: Tracheophytes
- Clade: Angiosperms
- Clade: Monocots
- Order: Asparagales
- Family: Iridaceae
- Genus: Iris
- Subgenus: Iris subg. Hermodactyloides

Type species
- Iris reticulata

Series
- See text

= Iris subg. Hermodactyloides =

Subgenus of flowering plants

The subgenus Hermodactyloides of Iris includes all reticulate-bulbed bulbous irises. It was formerly named as a genus, Iridodictyum by Rodionenko in 1961. but it was not widely accepted and most botanists preferred 'Hermodactyloides'.

Édouard Spach named the genus in 1846. The word 'Hermodactyloides' comes from 'Hermes', a Greek God, and 'daktylos' - finger. The name for the subgenus is very similar to Hermodactylus (the former name for Iris tuberosa), which was originally a separate genus to irises, but in 2001 was re-classified to be within the Hermodactyloides sub-genus.

Most species are native to central Europe and central Asia. They mostly have one or two long leaves and flower in early spring.

== Taxonomy ==
The subgenus Hermodactyloides is subdivided into two sections; Reticulatae and Monolepsis. Known species include:

=== Section Reticulatae ===
Image	Name	Distribution
	Iris danfordiae Baker.	southern Turkey
	Iris histrio Rchb. f.	Kyrgyzstan, Israel, Lebanon, Syria and southern Turkey
	Iris histrioides G.F.Wilson.	Turkey
	Iris pamphylica Hedge.	Turkey
	Iris reticulata Bieberstein. (includes Iris reticulata var. bakeriana Mathew and Wendlebo)	Azerbaijan to Iran.
	Iris tuberosa (formerly Hermodactylus tuberosus) L.	Albania, France, Greece, and Italy
	Iris vartanii Fost.	Israel, Jordan and Syria
	Iris winogradowii Fomin.	Azerbaijan and Georgia.
	Iris zagrica Brian Mathews and Mehdi Zarrei	Iran, Iraq

=== Section Monolepsis ===
Originally Rodionenko created the genus Alatavia for Iris kolpakowskiana and I. winkleri, but it was not validly published. B.Mathew then changed the name in 1989 to Iris sect. Monolepsis, after his re-organization of the genus. Molecular evidence places Monolepis as sister to a clade including section Reticulatae (including Hermodactylus), subgenus Xiphium and subsection Syriacae of section Limniris.

Having flattened crocus-like leaves;

Image	Name	Distribution
	Iris kolpakowskiana Regel.	Turkestan, Kazakhstan, Uzbekistan,[16] and Kyrgyzstan
	Iris winkleri Regal.	Turkestan, in Central Asia.

== Cultivation ==
This genus of dwarf bulbous iris is mostly used in rock gardens, or planted by specialist collectors in bulb frames.
