= Iris cedreti =

Conservation status
- Critically Endangered (IUCN 3.1)

Scientific classification
- Kingdom: Plantae
- Clade: Tracheophytes
- Clade: Angiosperms
- Clade: Monocots
- Order: Asparagales
- Family: Iridaceae
- Genus: Iris
- Subgenus: Iris subg. Iris
- Section: Iris sect. Oncocyclus
- Species: I. cedreti

Binomial name
- Iris cedreti Dinsm. ex Chaudhary

Synonyms
- None known

Species of plant

Iris cedreti is a species of flowering plant in the genus Iris; it is also in the subgenus of Iris. It is a rhizomatous perennial endemic to Lebanon. It has long narrow leaves, short stem, and flowers with a white background which is covered with very small dots or veins of dark maroon, purple, purplish-maroon, or almost black. It has a dark maroon signal patch with a brownish or purplish beard. It is rarely cultivated as an ornamental plant in temperate regions, as it needs very dry conditions during the summer. It is listed as critically endangered by the IUCN.

== Description ==
Iris cedreti has a compact, pale yellow rhizomes about 2.5 centimetres (1 in) wide, and has 8 or 9 leaves, which are up to 23 cm (9 in) long and 1–2 cm (0.4–0.8 in) wide. It is narrowed to the tip, with an acute apex, or is narrowly obtuse. It is considered to be a dwarf plant, rarely exceeding 40 cm (16 in) in height, and is normally between 30–40 cm (12–16 in) tall. It has inflated, green spathes (leaves of the flower bud), that are 10 cm (4 in) long, and the perianth tube is about 3 centimetres (1.2 in) in length.

The dwarf stems hold a terminal (top of stem) flower, blooming in May. The flowers are 18 cm (7 in) in diameter and have a white background which is covered with very small dots or veins of dark maroon, purple, purplish-maroon, or almost black. Like other irises, it has 2 pairs of petals, 3 large sepals (outer petals), known as the "falls", and 3 inner, smaller petals (or tepals), known as the "standards". The ovate shaped falls are between 6.5–8 cm (2.6–3.1 in) long and 4.5–5.5 cm (1.8–2.2 in) wide. In the centre of the falls is a rounded, dark maroon signal patch which is 1.7 centimetres (0.7 in) long and 1.5 centimetres (0.6 in) wide. Also, in the middle of the falls, is a row of short hairs called the "beard", which are brownish (rusty brown), purplish, or mottled. The obovate (narrower end at the base) standards are up to 8.5 cm (3.3 in) long and 6 cm (2.4 in) wide and they have a channeled claw (narrow section of petal closest to the stem). They have a triangular and 6 lobed, 3.3 centimetres (1.3 in) long ovary and 3.5–4 cm (1.4–1.6 in) long stamens, creamy-white anthers. The dark maroon-purple style branches are 4.5 centimetres (1.8 in) long and 2 centimetres (0.8 in) wide, with bi-lobes and a keel (ridge) with a small crest. After the iris has flowered, it produces an inflated, lobed seed capsule, which is narrowed toward both ends and is 8 cm (3.1 in) long. It contains many seeds which are arillated.

=== Biochemistry ===
As most irises are diploid, having two sets of chromosomes, this can be used to identify hybrids and classification of groupings. It has a chromosome count of 2n=20,

== Taxonomy ==
The species was first described by John Edward Dinsmore and published in 1972 by Shaukat Ali Chaudhary in Botaniska Notiser (Bot. Not.), Vol. 125, Issue 4, page 497.

The specific epithet is cedreti might refer to The Cedars, Lebanon, where the iris was found. Similar to Astragalus cedreti, and Verbascum cedreti, it can be commonly misspelt as I. cedretii (with 1 t and 2 i's), or as I. cedretti (with 2 t's and 1 i). and it is known in Arabic as سوسن الأرز. The name was verified by United States Department of Agriculture and the Agricultural Research Service on 4 April 2003 and then updated on 2 December 2004.

A 2016 study was published that focused on the karyological and cytogenetic characters of the seven Oncocyclus irises of Lebanon (including Iris cedreti). The study failed to show any genetic differences between the irises, indicating that if the species are distinct, then they must have differentiated extremely recently, or may in fact be synonymous. This is not entirely surprising, iris species were often described based on small morphological differences in flower colour between local populations, and very many taxa have been synonymised in the past few decades.

== Distribution and ecology ==
=== Distribution ===
Iris cedreti is endemic to Lebanon, and found along the Mount Lebanon mountain chain, including the Bsharri District.

=== Ecology ===
The flowers are primarily pollinated by night-sheltering male solitary bees, although honey bees are frequent diurnal visitors.

==== Habitat ====
It grows on the mountains, at the sub-alpine zone. on rocky slopes (of inclines up to 45°) that have good drainage, and in terra rossa soil on a karstic substrate.

It can be found at an altitude of 1,300 to 2,000 m (4,300 to 6,600 ft) above sea level.

In the Bsharri District, it grows with four other uncommon species: Carlina libanotica in Hadchit, and Potentilla libanotica, Arenaria libatonica, and Astragalus pinetorum in Bcharre. It can be found with Fritillaria hermonis, Romulea nivalis, Corydalis, and tulip species growing on the higher slopes of the mountains.

== Conservation ==
Iris cedreti is highly threatened. In 1996 Mouterde published that it had a wide range and found populations near the Cedars, between Ehden and the Cedars, and near Hasroun. A 2009 study proposed that it should be called 'endangered', as 50% of the known populations of the iris had been lost. In 2016 it was listed as 'critically endangered' by the IUCN.

Among the factors which threaten its survival are housing and road construction (or urbanization) which are the most severe, as they destroy natural habitats; this separates populations over wide areas and inhibits the movement of pollinators. The urbanization includes developments for winter tourism such as ski resorts, which cause desiccation on the slopes. Other habitat threats are agriculture and grazing by sheep and goats, flower picking (which stops seed development), and, in one site, the presence of an old sand quarry. Climate change also serves to reduce snow cover, and the IUCN claims the plant cannot very easily adapt to changes.

In 2016 the IUCN claimed that there were no conservation measures to protect this species in Lebanon, however, as part of a conservation plan, seeds of I. cedreti (in 2004) and I. sofarana subsp. kasruwana (in 2001 and 2003) were collected by the Lebanese Agricultural Research Institute and stored at the Millennium Seed Bank in Wakehurst Place, part of the Royal Botanic Gardens, Kew. A reserve at Jabal El Makmel of 400 hectares was also created between 2006 and 2007 to stop grazing and allow the natural regeneration of the forest. It benefited trees of Juniperus excelsa and Acer tauricolum, as well as the iris. In 2009, only 2.5% of Lebanon's mountainous area was protected by nature reserves. A population of I. cedreti in Hasroun was reported extinct in 2009.

== Cultivation ==
Iris cedreti prefers to grow in a sunny, well drained, rocky habitat.

A study was carried out on Pancratium maritimum and I. cedreti in 2004 to find out the best forms of growing new embryos of the rare plants. It was found that a sucrose concentration (of 10%) used in an in-vitro culture worked best for the iris. Collar thickness, root system branching, and the number of leaves were also important factors for successful transplanting of seedlings. Seedlings can be grown in a mixture of peat moss, perlite, and sandy loam in clay pots within a greenhouse.

An herbarium specimen of the iris exists in the National Museum of Natural History, Paris.

=== Propagation ===
Irises can generally be propagated by division or by seed growing. Irises generally require a period of cold, then a period of warmth and heat; they also need some moisture. Some seeds need stratification (the cold treatment), which can be carried out indoors or outdoors. Seedlings are generally potted on (or transplanted) when they have 3 leaves.

== Toxicity ==
Like many other irises, most parts of the plant are poisonous (rhizome and leaves). If mistakenly ingested it can cause stomach pains and vomiting. Handling the plant may cause skin irritation or an allergic reaction.

== Culture ==
The iris has inspired a fragrance perfume called Infusion d'Iris Cedre from Prada. One of a set of six released in 2015, the perfume contains scents of iris, neroli, cedarwood, vetiver, incense, and benzoin.

== Other sources ==
- Mathew, B. The Iris. 1981 (Iris) 48.
- Saad L. 2001, Propagation and conservation of Iris cedretii Dinsmore and Vinca libanotica, Zucc. M. Sc. American University of Beirut page 97
