= Constantin Georg Alexander Winkler =

Russian botanist (1848–1900)

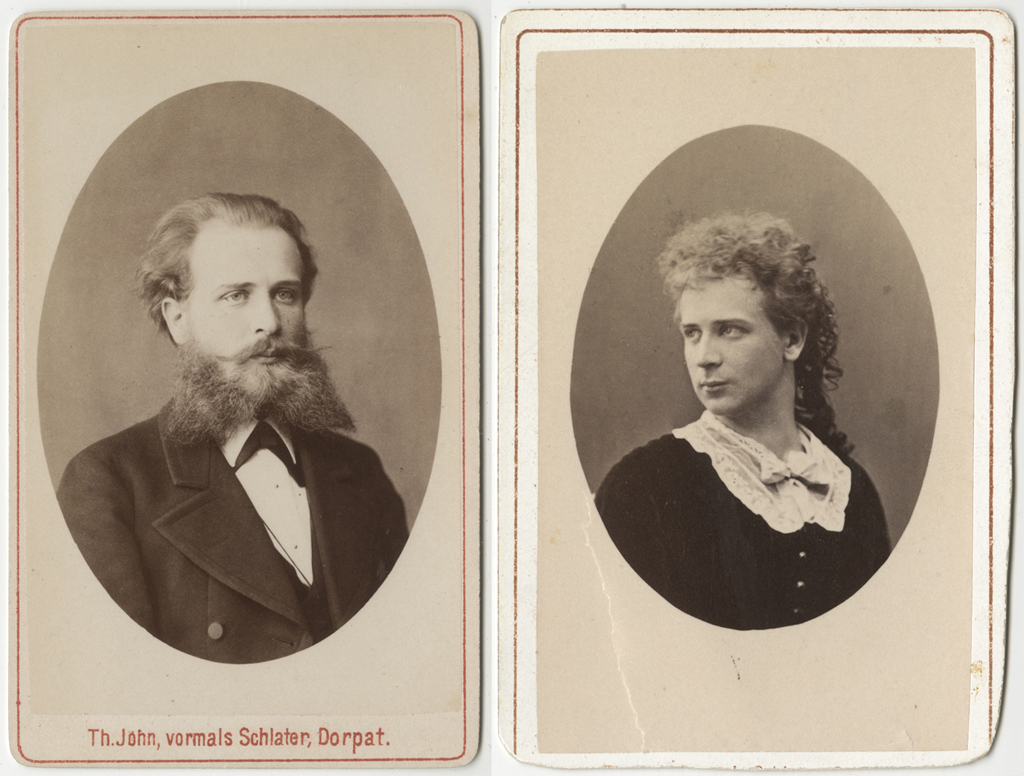
Constantin Georg Alexander Winkler (1848–1900).

Constantin Georg Alexander Winkler (14 June 1848 in Medvedevo near Velikiye Luki – 3 February 1900 in Wesenberg) was a Russian botanist of Baltic-German heritage.

From 1871 to 1874 he studied botany at the Imperial University of Dorpat, where from 1874 to 1879, he worked as an assistant to Edmund Russow at the botanical garden. In the meantime he taught classes in natural sciences at several schools. From 1879 to 1899 he was associated with the Saint Petersburg Botanical Garden; as curator of its herbarium (1879–97) and as head botanist (1897–99). At Saint Petersburg he played a major role in reorganization of its herbaria and the greenhouse collections. In 1899 he relocated to the town of Wesenberg, where he died the following year.

He is known for his work in the field of plant systematics, and was the taxonomic authority of many species within the botanical family Asteraceae. The genus Winklera (Regel) commemorates his name, as do a number of species with the epithet of winkleri; as an example, Iris winkleri (Winkler iris).

== Selected works ==
- Decades Compositarum novarum Turkestaniae nec non Bucharae incolorum, 1885–91.
- Plantae Turcomanicae a Radde, Walter, Antonow aliisque collectae, 1889.
- Diagnoses Compositarum novarum asiaticarum, 1893–95.
- Neue Cousinien des Orients (with Joseph Bornmüller), 1895.
- Die flora des Alburs und der Kaspischen Südküste : bisherige Forschungsergebnisse auf diesem Gebiet (with Friedrich Alexander Buhse), 1899.
