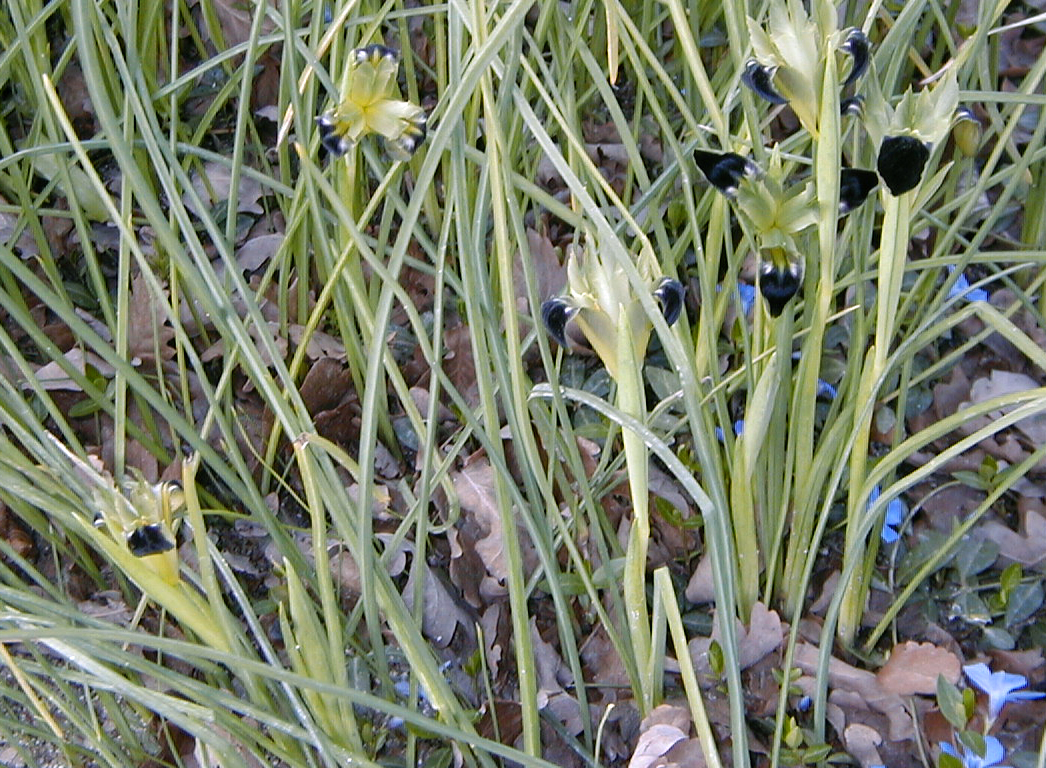

Scientific classification
- Kingdom: Plantae
- Clade: Embryophytes
- Clade: Tracheophytes
- Clade: Angiosperms
- Clade: Monocots
- Order: Asparagales
- Family: Iridaceae
- Genus: Iris
- Subgenus: Iris subg. Hermodactyloides
- Section: Iris sect. Reticulatae
- Species: I. tuberosa

Binomial name
- Iris tuberosa L.

Synonyms
- Synonyms of Iris tuberosa: Hermodactylus tuberosus (L.) Mill.; Synonyms of Iris tuberosa var. tuberosa: Hermodactylus bispathaceus Sweet; Hermodactylus calatajeronensis Tod. ex Lojac.; Hermodactylus repens Sweet; Hermodactylus zambranii Lojac.; Iris bispathacea (Sweet) Spach; Synonyms of Iris tuberosa var. longifolia (Sweet) ined.: Hermodactylus longifolius Sweet; Hermodactylus tuberosus subsp. longifolius (Sweet) K.Richt.; Iris longifolia (Sweet) Spach

= Iris tuberosa =

Species of flowering plant

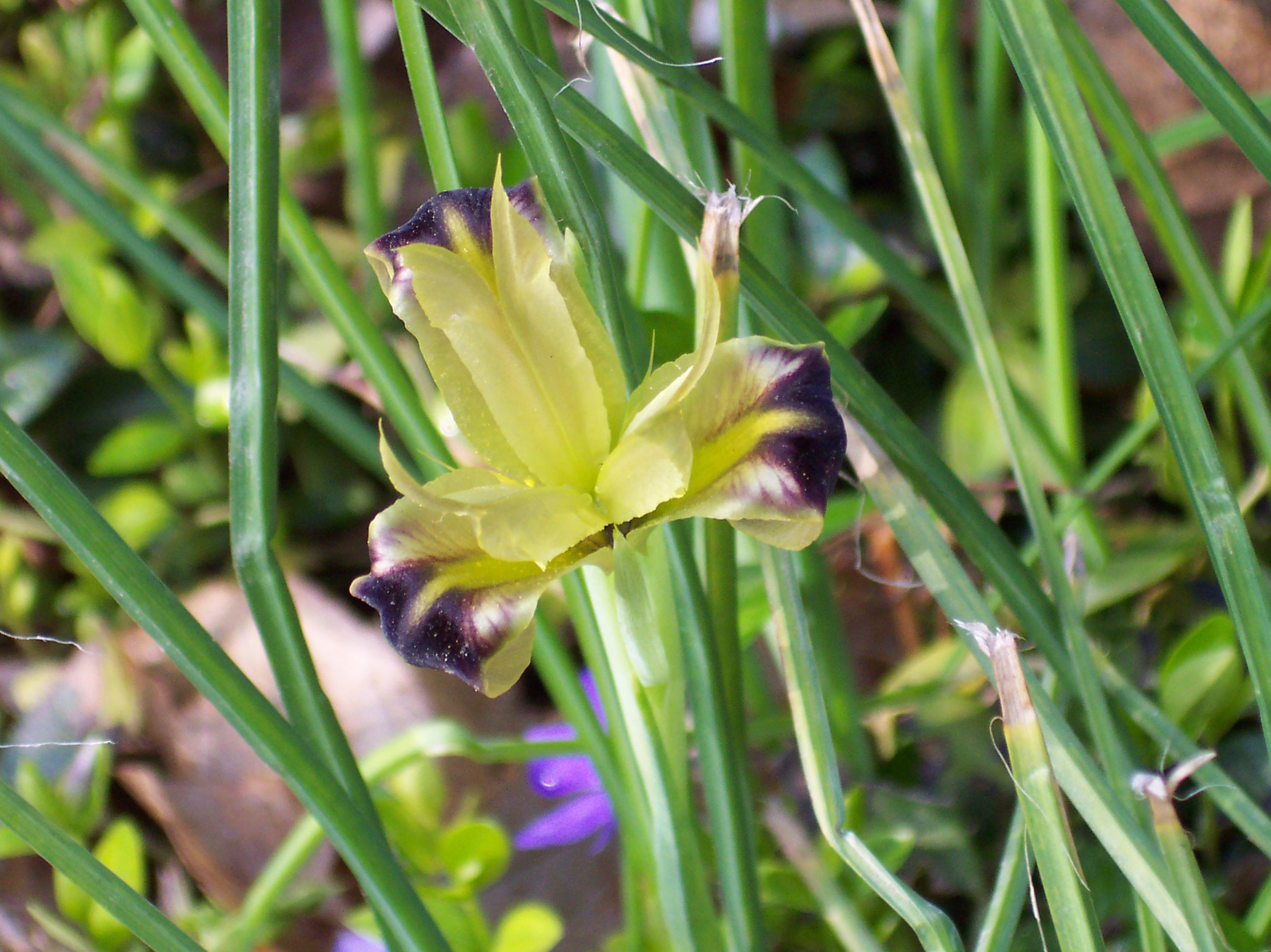
Iris tuberosa

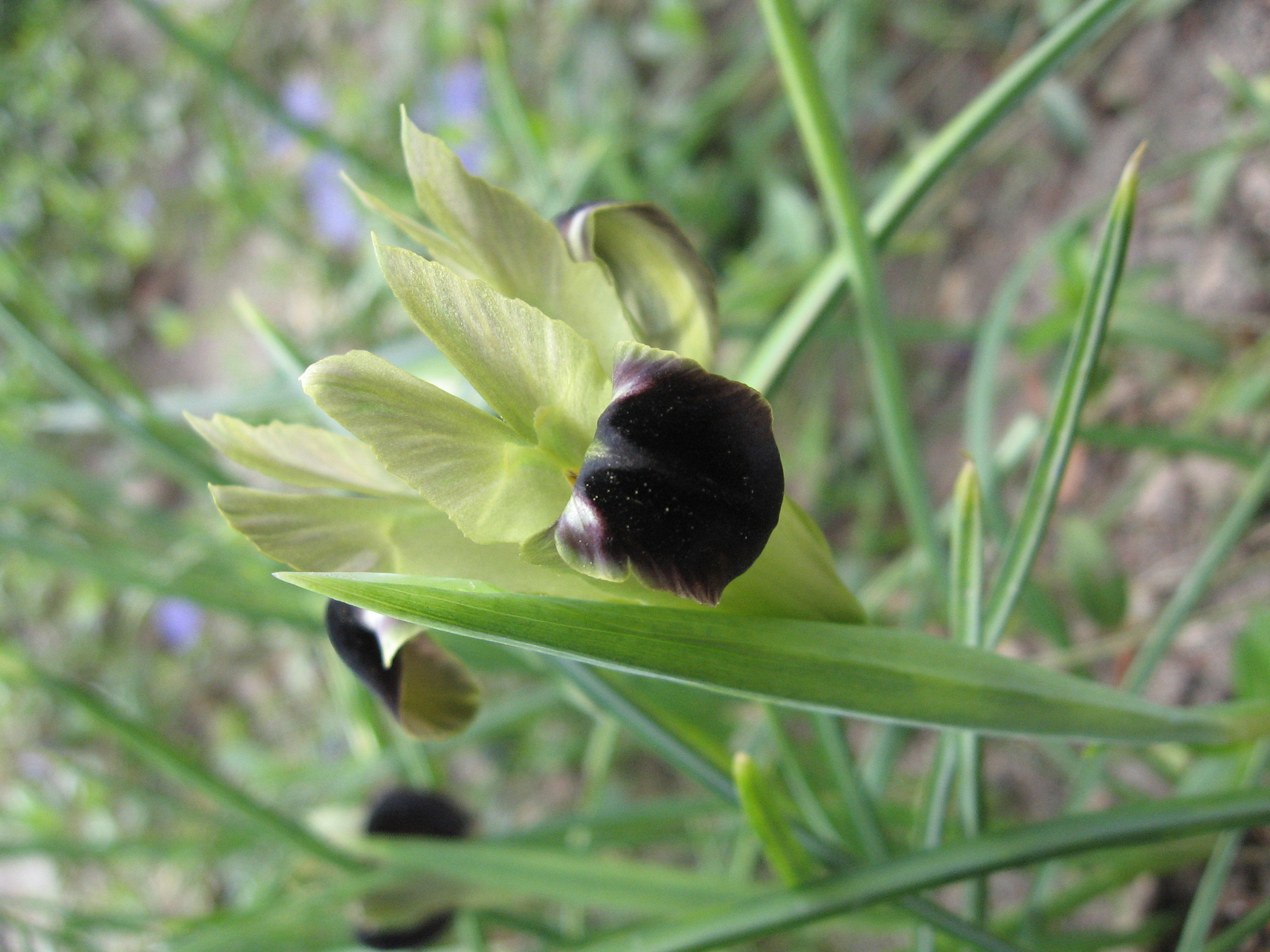
Iris tuberosa

Iris tuberosa (formerly Hermodactylus tuberosus) is a species of tuberous flowering plant of the genus Iris, with the common names snake's-head, snake's-head iris, widow iris, black iris, or velvet flower-de-luce.

== Distribution ==
A native of the Mediterranean region, it is found in the northern Mediterranean littoral and western Europe.

It can be found in Albania, France, Greece, and Italy.

== Cultivation ==
It is grown from tubers planted in the autumn. It grows best in full sun to partial shade, and requires well-drained soil. It can naturalise in grassy areas but grows well in rock gardens or containers. It is a common ornamental garden plant, flowering in early spring. It is rather tender in the UK.

== Taxonomic history ==
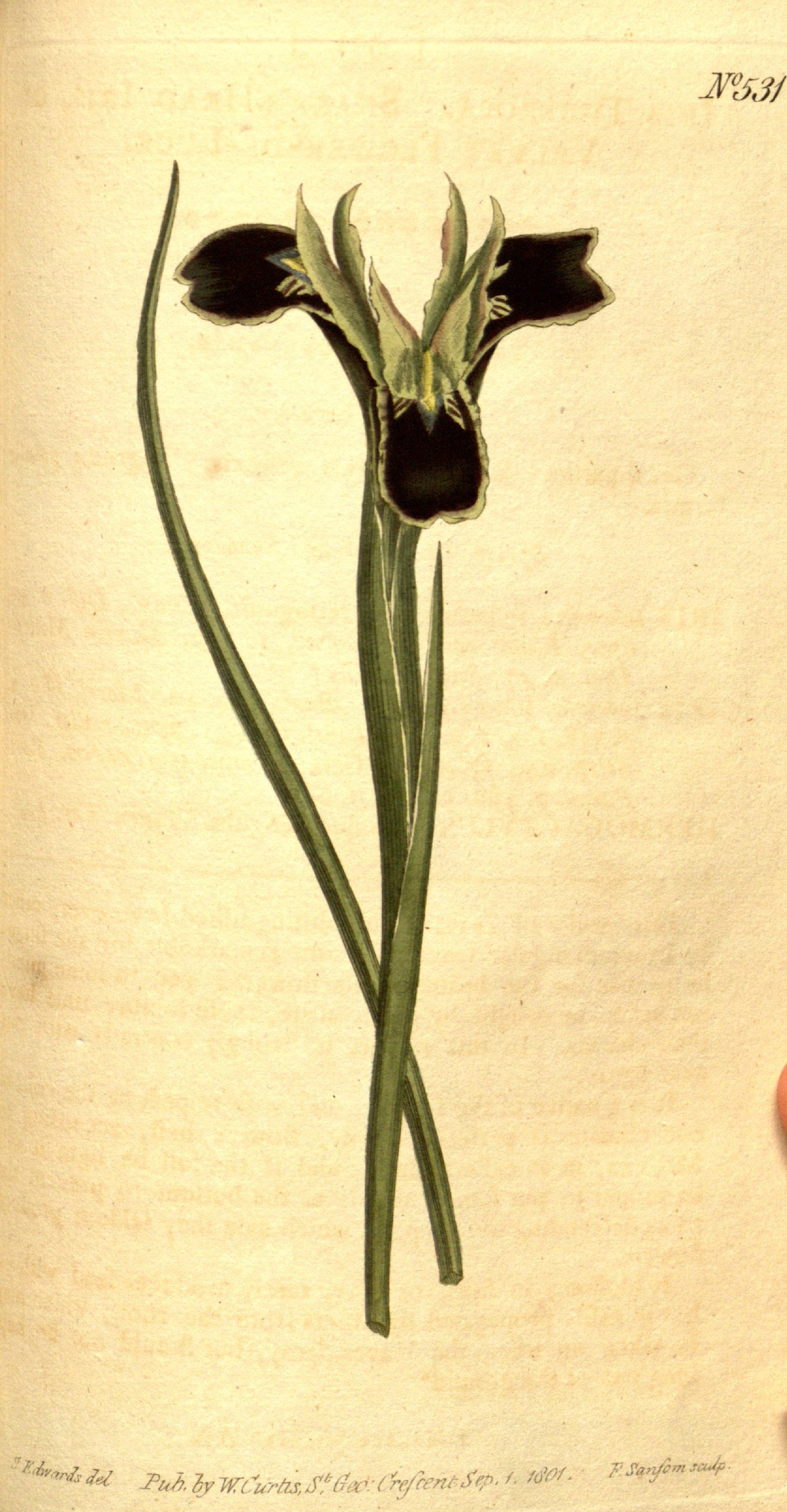
Illustration from 1801

After being split off from the genus Iris in the nineteenth century into a separate genus, Hermodactylus, it has most recently been returned to the genus Iris, following molecular studies at Kew. According to the proposed molecular classification of irises of Tillie, Chase and Hall, this species is now best seen as a member of the subgenus Hermodactyloides, the reticulate-bulbed bulbous irises.

== Bibliography ==
- Telegraph: How to grow Hermodactylus
- Manning, John; Goldblatt, Peter (2008). The Iris Family: Natural History & Classification. Portland, Oregon: Timber Press. pp. 204–207. ISBN 978-0-88192-897-6.
- Goldblatt, P., (1990) Phylogeny and classification of Iridaceae. Ann. Missouri Bot. Gard. 77:607-627.
- Reeves, G., Chase, M.W., Goldblatt, P., Rudall, P., Fay, M.F., Cox, A.V., LeJeune, B., & Souza-Chies, T., (2001). Molecular systematics of Iridaceae: Evidence from four plastid DNA regions. Am. J. Bot. 88:2074-2087.
- Iridaceae: in L. Watson and M.J. Dallwitz (1992 onwards). The families of flowering plants: descriptions, illustrations, identification, information retrieval
