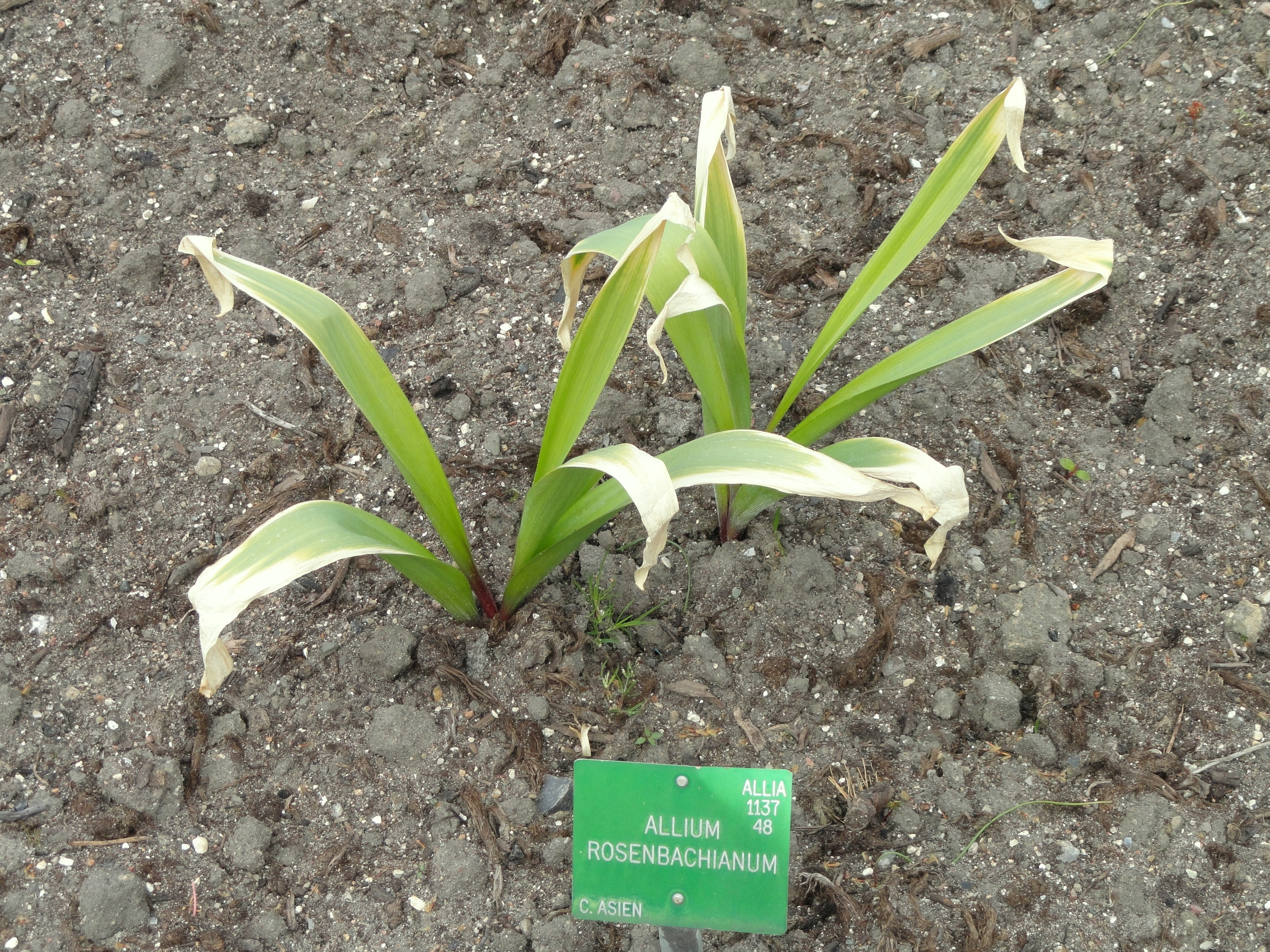

Scientific classification
- Kingdom: Plantae
- Clade: Tracheophytes
- Clade: Angiosperms
- Clade: Monocots
- Order: Asparagales
- Family: Amaryllidaceae
- Subfamily: Allioideae
- Genus: Allium
- Subgenus: Allium subg. Melanocrommyum
- Species: A. rosenbachianum

Binomial name
- Allium rosenbachianum Regel

= Allium rosenbachianum =

Species of plant

Allium rosenbachianum is a plant species found high in the Himalayas of Pakistan, Afghanistan, Kyrgyzstan and Tajikistan and cultivated in many other regions as an ornamental. It is a perennial herb with bulbs up to 30 mm across. Scape is up to 100 cm tall, with a spherical umbel of many reddish-purple flowers with long pedicels.
