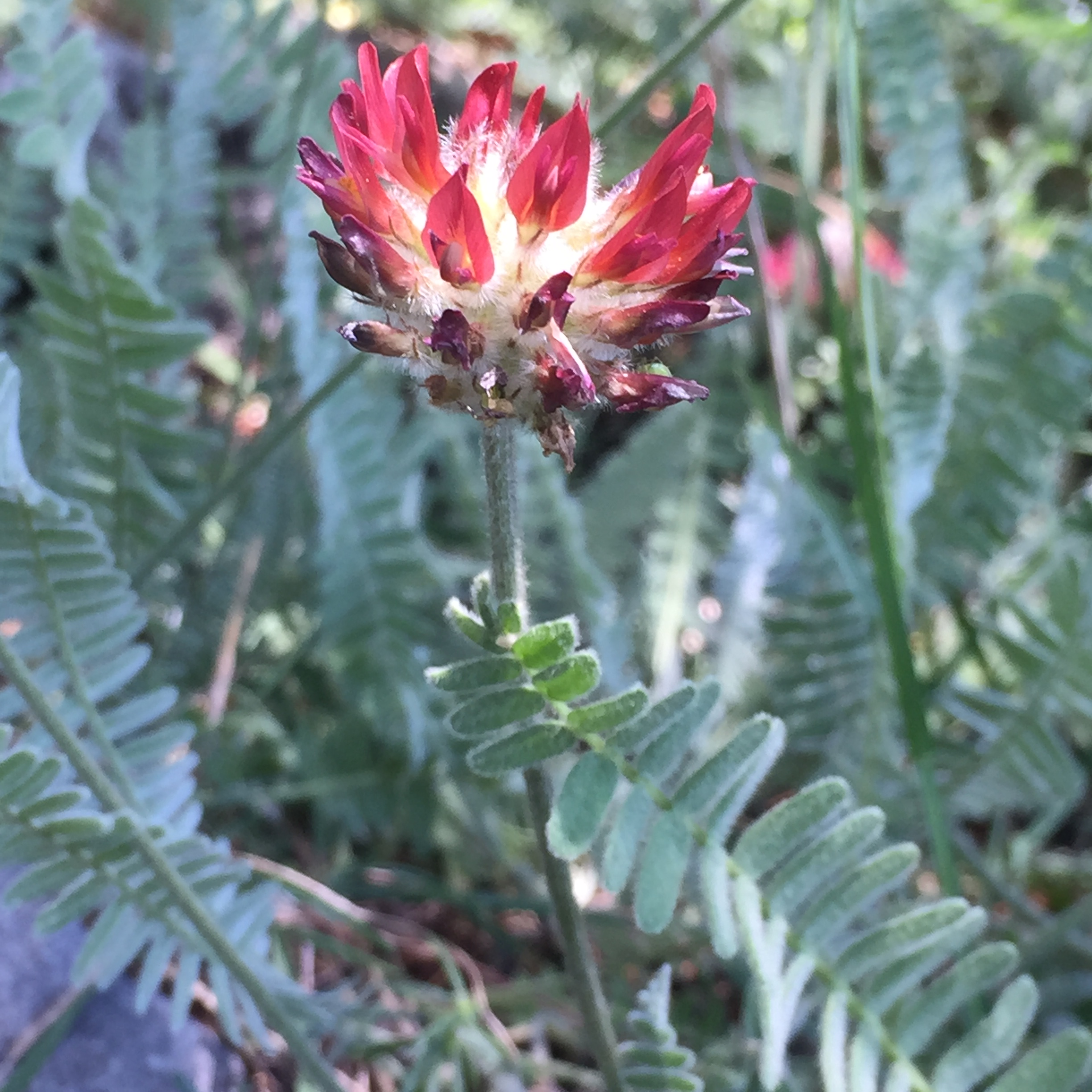
- Astragalus cedreti growing in its natural habitat in the Tannourine cedar reserve

Scientific classification
- Kingdom: Plantae
- Clade: Embryophytes
- Clade: Tracheophytes
- Clade: Spermatophytes
- Clade: Angiosperms
- Clade: Eudicots
- Clade: Rosids
- Order: Fabales
- Family: Fabaceae
- Subfamily: Faboideae
- Genus: Astragalus
- Species: A. cedreti

Binomial name
- Astragalus cedreti Boiss.

Synonyms
- Tragacantha cedreti (Boiss.) Kuntze

= Astragalus cedreti =

Species of flowering plant

Astragalus cedreti (also called cedar astragalus; Arabic: أَسْطراغالس الأرز) is a species of flowering plant in the legume family. It is a perennial plant with alternating, smooth pinnate leaves and red flowers. It blooms in June.

== Description ==
Astragalus cedreti grows close to the ground. It has grayish pinnate leaves, 10 cm (3.9 in) long, with lanceolate stipules. The leaves are pinnately-divided into 20 to 25 leaflets having a smooth contour. The 25 cm (9.8 in) peduncle supports a dense ovate 3 cm (1.2 in) wide raceme. The plant has linear and very hispid bracts, the sepals are 1 cm (0.39 in) long harboring pink-red corollas. The fruit is a very hirsute pod with yellowish hairs.

== Distribution and habitat ==
The cedar astragalus is endemic to the mountains of Mount Lebanon.
