= Friedrich Alexander Buhse =

Baltic-German botanist (1821–1898)

Friedrich Alexander Buhse (30 November 1821, Riga – 29 December 1898) was a Baltic-German botanist.

From 1840 he studied botany at the universities of Dorpat, Berlin and Heidelberg, receiving his PhD in 1843. In 1847–49, with Pierre Edmond Boissier, he collected plants in Transcaucasia and Persia. In 1852 he became a correspondent member of the Société linnéenne de Lyon.

With Boissier he circumscribed many species of plants. The botanical genus Buhsia (family Capparaceae) was named in his honor by Alexander Bunge.

== Selected works ==
- Ueber den Fruchtkörper der Flechten (Lichines), 1846 – On the fruiting bodies of lichens.
- Bergreise von Gilan nach Asterabad, 1849 – Mountain travels in Gilan near Asterabad.
- Nachrichten über drei pharmacologischwichtige Pflanzen und über die grosse Salzwüste in Persien, 1850 – On three important pharmacological plants and the large salt desert in Persia.
- Aufzählung der auf einer Reise durch Transkaukasien und Persien gesammelten Pflanzen, (with Pierre Edmond Boissier), 1860 – List of plants collected on the journey through Transcaucasia and Persia.
- Liste der Gefässpflanzen des Alburs und der Kapischen Südküste, 1899 – List of vascular plants of Alborz and the Caspian southern coast.
- Die flora des Alburs und der Kaspischen Südküste (with C. Winkler), 1899 – The flora of Alborz and the Caspian southern coast.
