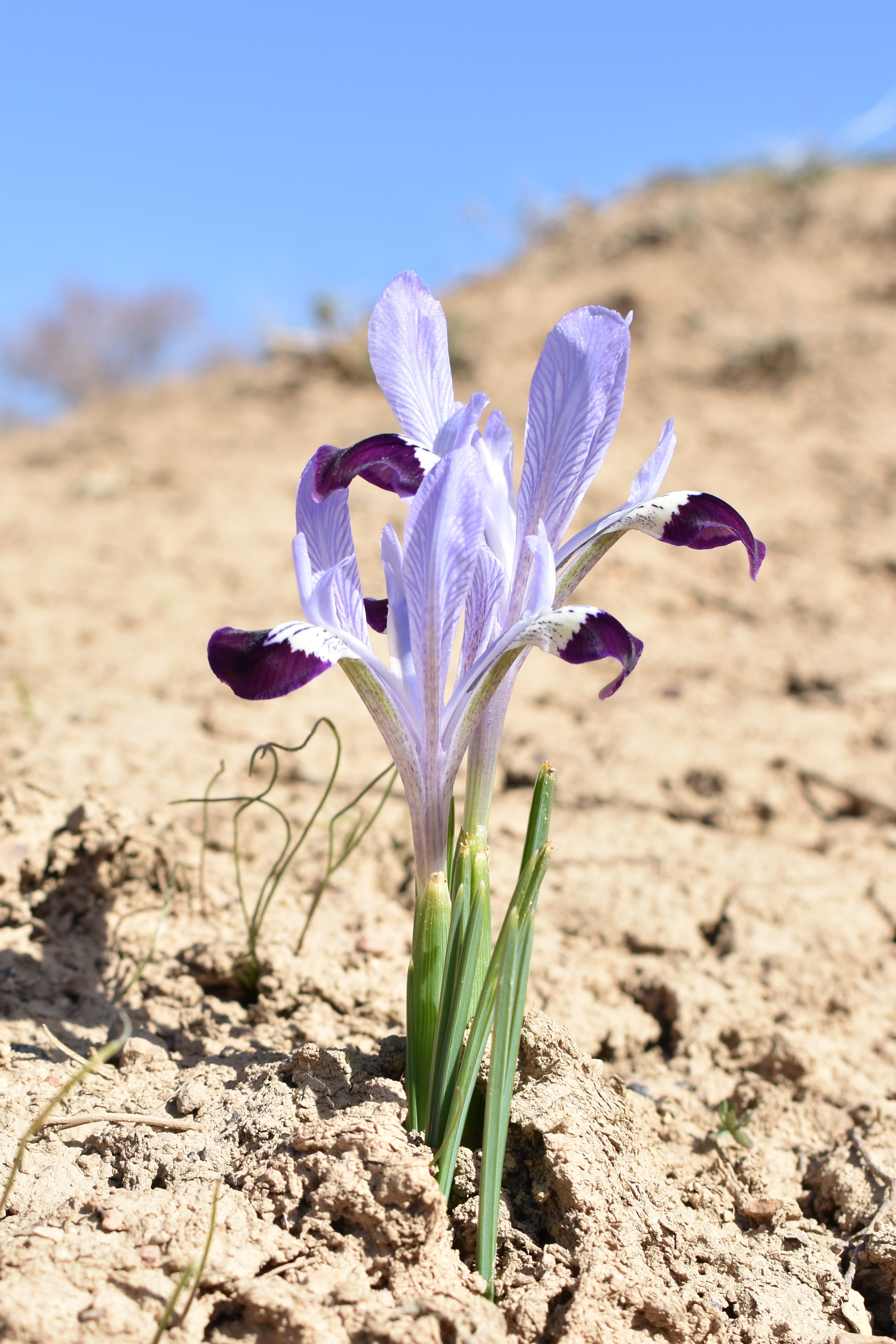

Scientific classification
- Kingdom: Plantae
- Clade: Embryophytes
- Clade: Tracheophytes
- Clade: Angiosperms
- Clade: Monocots
- Order: Asparagales
- Family: Iridaceae
- Genus: Iris
- Subgenus: Iris subg. Hermodactyloides
- Section: Iris sect. Monolepsis
- Species: I. kolpakowskiana

Binomial name
- Iris kolpakowskiana Regel

Synonyms
- Alatavia kolpakowskiana (Regel) Rodion.; Iridodictyum kolpakowskianum (Regel) Rodion.; Xiphion kolpakowskianum (Regel) Baker

= Iris kolpakowskiana =

Species of flowering plant

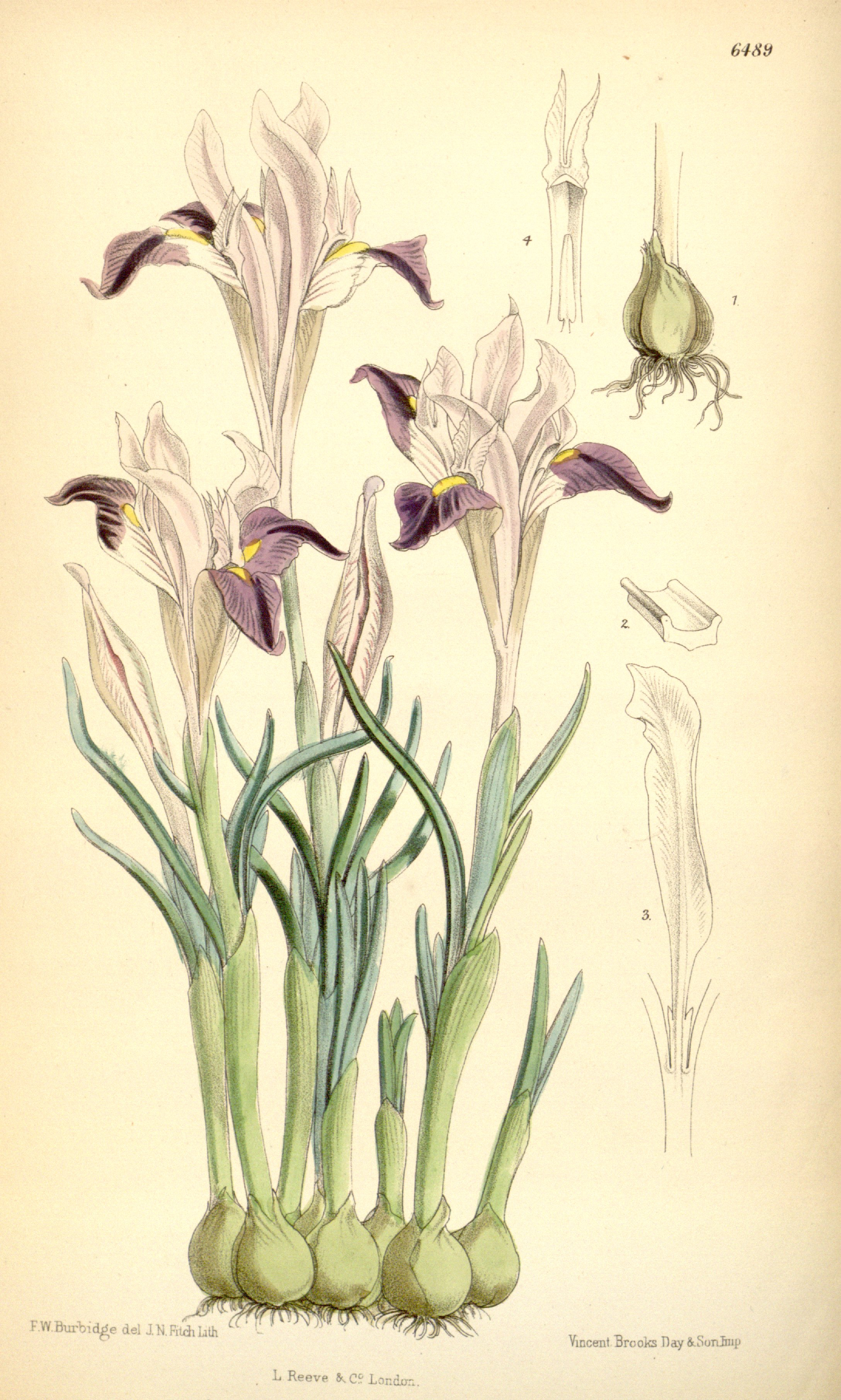
Botanical illustration

Iris kolpakowskiana, or Kolpakowski's iris, is a plant species in the genus Iris, it is classified in the subgenus Hermodactyloides and section Monolepsis. It is a bulbous perennial from Asia.

== Description ==
It has a bulb covered with a densely reticulate fibrous tunics.

It has 3–4 leaves, which are similar to many irises of the genus Scorpiris, although it has only a few leaves at flowering time.

They are 3.5–11 cm (1.4–4.3 in) long, and can increase up to 30 cm (12 in) later after flowering. They are 0.2 cm wide and ribbed on the underside.

It has a very short stem, green spathes (leaves of the flower bud) and perianth tube 5–9 cm (2.0–3.5 in) long.

It blooms in late winter, between March, and April.

The flowers are bi-tone (2 coloured), they come in purple shades, from reddish-violet, lilac-violet, pale lilac to pale purple.

Like other irises, it has 2 pairs of petals, 3 large sepals (outer petals), known as the 'falls' and 3 inner, smaller petals (or tepals), known as the 'standards'. The falls are lanceolate shaped, 3.5–4 cm (1.4–1.6 in) long. They are dark violet, purple, or dark reddish purple, with a yellow, or yellow orange ridge. The standards are obovate or oblanceolate shaped and 3.5–5 cm (1.4–2.0 in) long.

It has stamens with filaments that are 0.5–0.9 cm long.

After the iris has flowered, it produces a cylindrical with a short beak seed capsule.

=== Biochemistry ===
As most irises are diploid, having two sets of chromosomes, this can be used to identify hybrids and classification of groupings. It was counted as 2n=20.

== Taxonomy ==
It is pronounced as (Iris) EYE-ris (kolpakowskiana) kol-pa-kow-skee-AY-nuh. It is sometimes known as 'Kolpakowski's Iris'.

It is sometimes mis-spelt as Iris kolpakowskyana. It was named after the first Russian military Governor of Semirechye Oblast in modern Kazakhstan Gerasim Alexeevich Kolpakovsky. See also Sun Tulip or Kolpakowski Tulip.

The iris was first described by Eduard August von Regel in the Botanical Magazine No.6489 in 1880.

Iris kolpakowskiana is now an accepted name by the RHS, and was verified by United States Department of Agriculture and the Agricultural Research Service on 2 October 2014.

== Distribution and habitat ==
It is native to temperate Asia.

=== Range ===
It is found in the Tien Shan Mountains, Turkestan. It is also found in Kazakhstan, Uzbekistan, and Kyrgyzstan.

=== Habitat ===
It grows on the hillsides, and open grassy slopes, in wet sticky clay that dries out in summer.

It is normally found at 800–3,000 m (2,600–9,800 ft) above sea level, near the melting snowline.

== Conservation ==
It was on the 1997 IUCN Red List of Threatened Plants.

== Other sources ==
- Czerepanov, S. K. 1995. Vascular plants of Russia and adjacent states (the former USSR). (referred to as Iridodictyum kolpakowskianum (Regel) Rodion)
- Komarov, V. L. et al., eds. 1934–1964. Flora SSSR.
- Mathew, B. 1981. The Iris. 177.
