= George Fergusson Wilson =

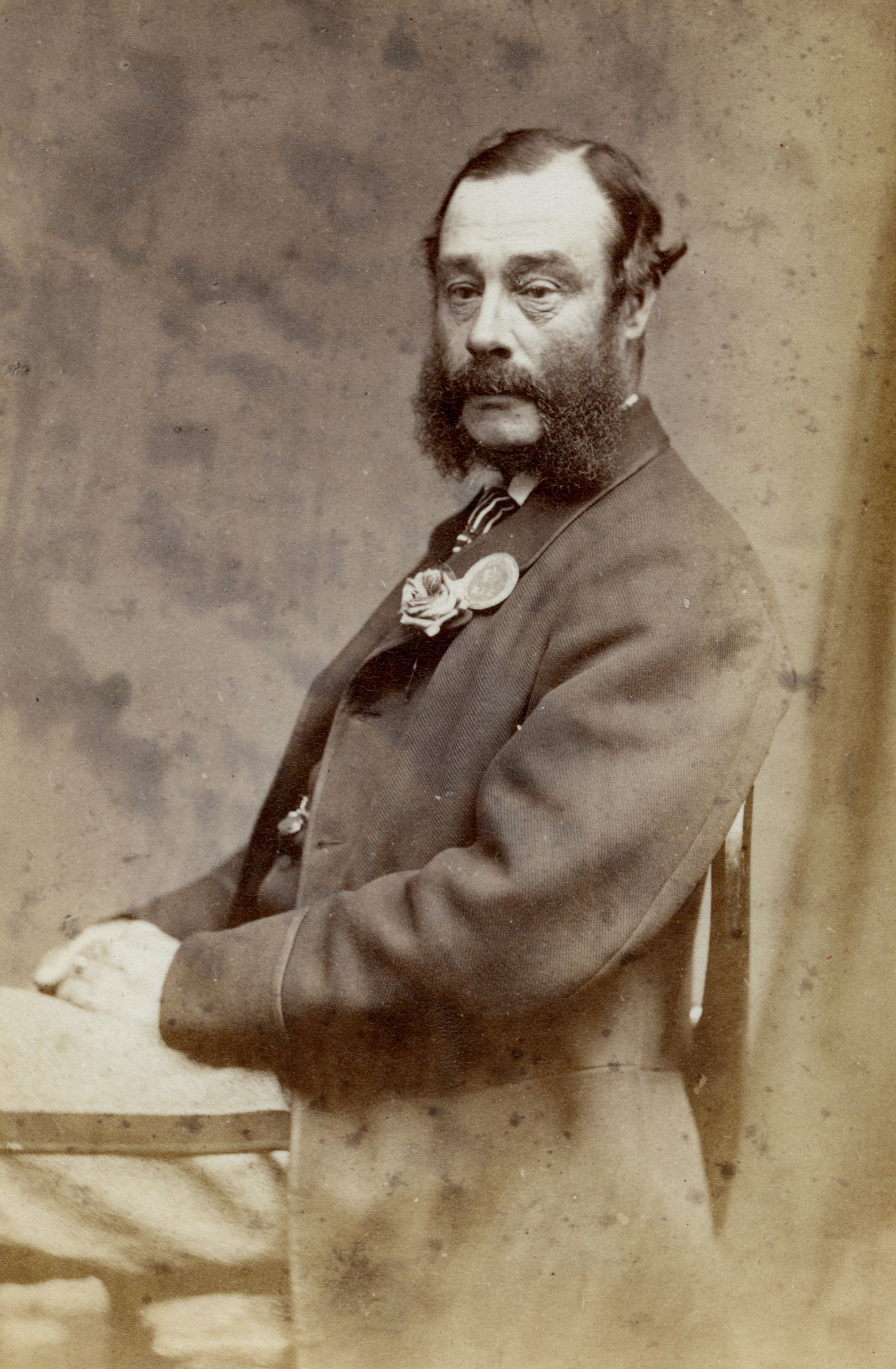

George Fergusson Wilson (25 March 1822 – 28 March 1902) was an English industrial chemist, inventor and horticulturist. At one time he was the owner of Prices Patent Candle Company, the largest manufacturer of candles in the world. He was also an experimental gardener and established gardens at Heatherbank House, Weybridge, and Oakwood, Wisley. The latter would go on to form the basis of RHS Garden Wisley.

== Life ==
Born at Wandsworth Common on 25 March 1822, he was the sixth son in a family of thirteen children of William Wilson, at one time a merchant in Russia and subsequently founder at Battersea of a candle-making firm, E. Price & Son. His mother was Margaret Nimmo Dickson of Kilbucho and Culture in Scotland. He was educated at Wandsworth, and for a short time worked in a solicitor's office.

== Business career ==
Wilson in 1840 entered his father's business. He took interest in the firm's experimental work, and in 1842 patented, with W. C. Jones, a process by which cheap, malodorous fats could be utilised in the place of tallow for candle-making. The original features of the process were the use of sulphuric acid as a decoloriser and deodoriser of strongly-smelling fats, and their subsequent distillation, when acidified, by the aid of super-heated steam. The invention was profitable, and in the Panic of 1847 the business was sold for £250,000.

A new concern, called Price's Patent Candles Ltd., with a capital of £500,000, was then formed, with George Wilson and an elder brother James as managing directors. Both researched processes of manufacture. Wilson in 1853 introduced moulded coco-stearin lights (from coconut oil) as "New Patent Night Lights"; and the two brothers made improvements on a French patent which led to the wide adoption by English manufacturers of the company's "oleine" or "cloth oil".’

In 1854 Wilson made a major discovery, a process of manufacturing pure glycerine, which was first separated from fats and oils at high temperature, and then purified in an atmosphere of steam. Previously, commercial glycerine had been impure.

== Later life ==
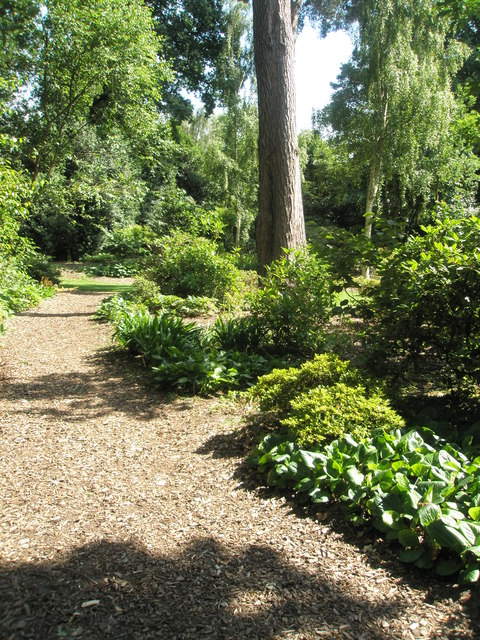
RHS Wisley today

Wilson retired from his position of managing director in 1863, and in later life lived at Wisley, Surrey, where he devoted himself to experimental gardening on a wide scale. He was particularly successful as a cultivator of lilies. The garden he created at Wisley went to the Royal Horticultural Society, becoming the RHS Garden.

Wilson died at Weybridge Heath on 28 March 1902.

== Learned societies, works and awards ==
In 1845 Wilson was made a member of the Society of Arts. He contributed frequently to its Journal, read a paper before it in 1852 on "Stearic Candle Manufacture", was a member of its council from 1854 to 1859 and again from 1864 to 1867, and its treasurer from 1861 to 1863. In 1854 he read before the Royal Society a paper on "The Value of Steam in the Decomposition of Neutral Fatty Bodies", and was elected a fellow in 1855. In that year, too, he was elected a fellow of the Chemical Society, and read at the meeting of the British Association at Glasgow a paper on "A New Mode of obtaining Pure Glycerine".

Elected a fellow of the Horticultural Society, he served on some of its committees, and was at one time vice-president. At his suggestion the society introduced guinea subscriptions, and in 1876 he published a pamphlet entitled The Royal Horticultural Society: as it is and as it might be. He receives the Victoria Medal of Honour in 1897. In 1875, he was elected a fellow of the Linnean Society.

== Family ==
Wilson married on 13 August 1862 Ellen, eldest daughter of R. W. Barchard, of East Hill, Wandsworth, who survived him with two sons and a daughter. The elder son was Scott Barchard Wilson.

== Notes ==
Attribution

This article incorporates text from a publication now in the public domain: Fryer, Sydney Ernest (1912). "Wilson, George Fergusson". In Lee, Sidney (ed.). Dictionary of National Biography (2nd supplement). London: Smith, Elder & Co. pp. 189–690.

Wilson, George Fergusson (DNB12)
