= John Gilbert Baker =

British botanist (1834–1920)

John Gilbert Baker FRS
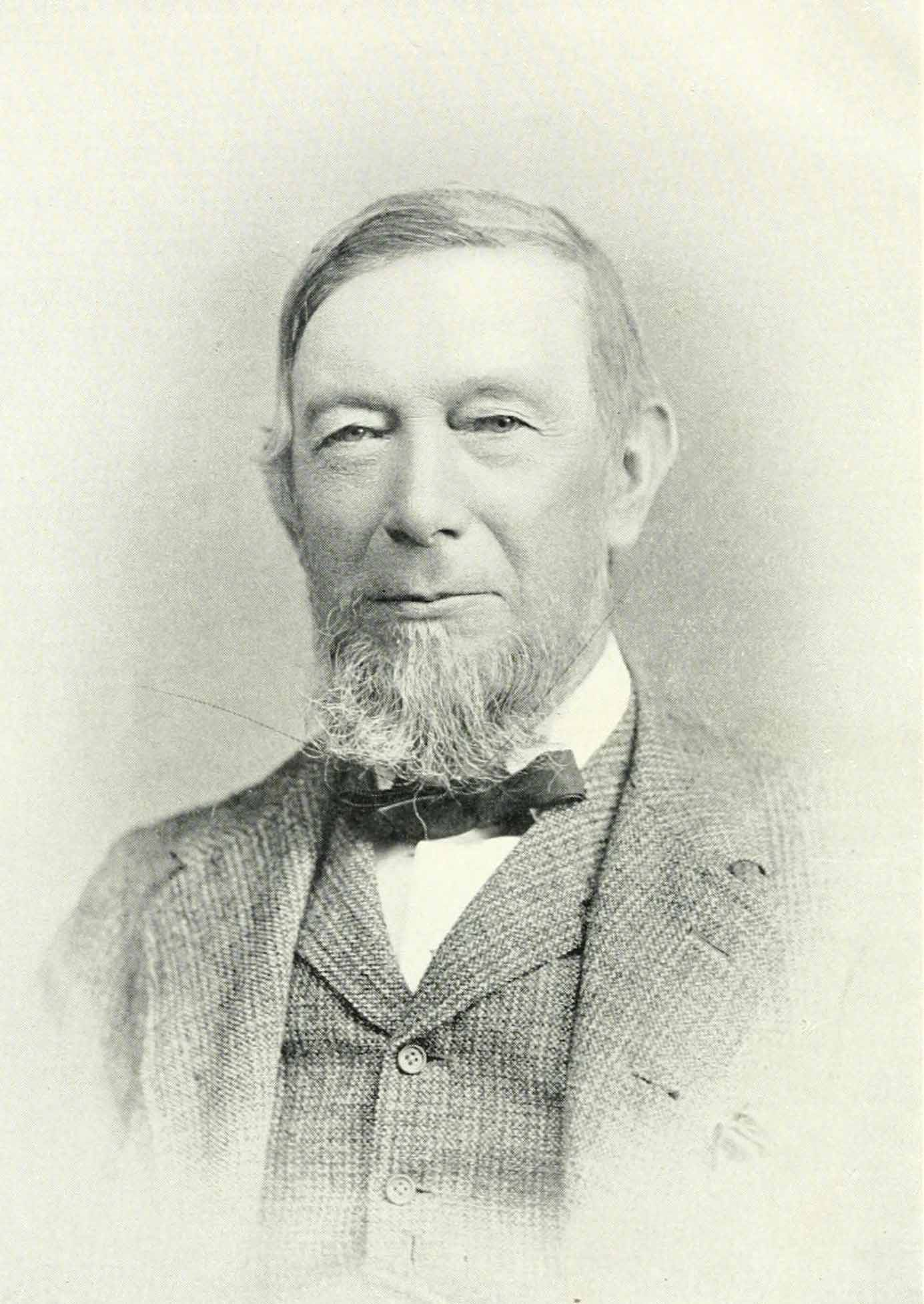
- Portrait of Baker by Berthold Carl Seemann, 1901
- Born: 13 January 1834; Guisborough, England
- Died: 16 August 1920 (aged 86); Kew, Richmond upon Thames, England
- Occupation: Botanist
- Spouse: Hannah Unthank (m. 1860–1902)
- Children: Edmund Gilbert Baker
- Scientific career
- Author abbrev. (botany): Baker

John Gilbert Baker FRS (13 January 1834 – 16 August 1920) was a British botanist and keeper of the Herbarium at Kew Gardens.

== Biography ==
Baker was born in Guisborough in North Yorkshire, the son of John and Mary (née Gilbert) Baker, and died in Kew. He lived in Thirsk (North Yorkshire) until 1864 when the drapers store owned by his family burnt down. The place where he lived in the town, now called Bakers Alley, is marked by a blue plaque which was unveiled in 2005 by Professor Simon Owens who, like his renowned predecessor, was then Keeper of the Herbarium at Kew.

He was educated at Ackworth School and Bootham School, York, both being Quaker schools.

He subsequently worked at the library and herbarium of the Royal Botanic Gardens, Kew between 1866 and 1899, and was keeper of the herbarium from 1890 to 1899. He wrote handbooks on many plant groups, including Amaryllidaceae, Bromeliaceae, Iridaceae, Liliaceae, and ferns. His published works include Flora of Mauritius and the Seychelles (1877) and Handbook of the Irideae (1892). Baker issued several exsiccata-like series, among others the series Plants of North Yorkshire and Herbarium of British Roses [Herbarium Rosarum Britannicarum].

John G. Baker was elected a Fellow of the Royal Society in 1878. as well as honorary membership of the Manchester Literary and Philosophical Society in 1886. He was awarded the Veitch Memorial Medal of the Royal Horticultural Society in 1907.

== Personal life ==
In August 1860, Baker married Hannah Unthank (died 1902). The couple had at least two children, including the botanist Edmund Gilbert Baker. (Note: Baker is cited as being the father of the botanist Lilian E. Porter however, Baker only had one daughter Katherine Unthank Baker (died 1918).)

== Taxa named in honour ==
Several plant species with the epithet bakeriana or bakeranius and bakeranium have been named in honour of John G. Baker.

Including;

- Hieracium bakerianum
- Hymenostegia bakeriana
- Iris reticulata var. bakeriana (also known as Iris bakeriana)
- Lilium bakerianum
- Rhodolaena bakeriana
- Rubus bakerianus

== Selected publications ==
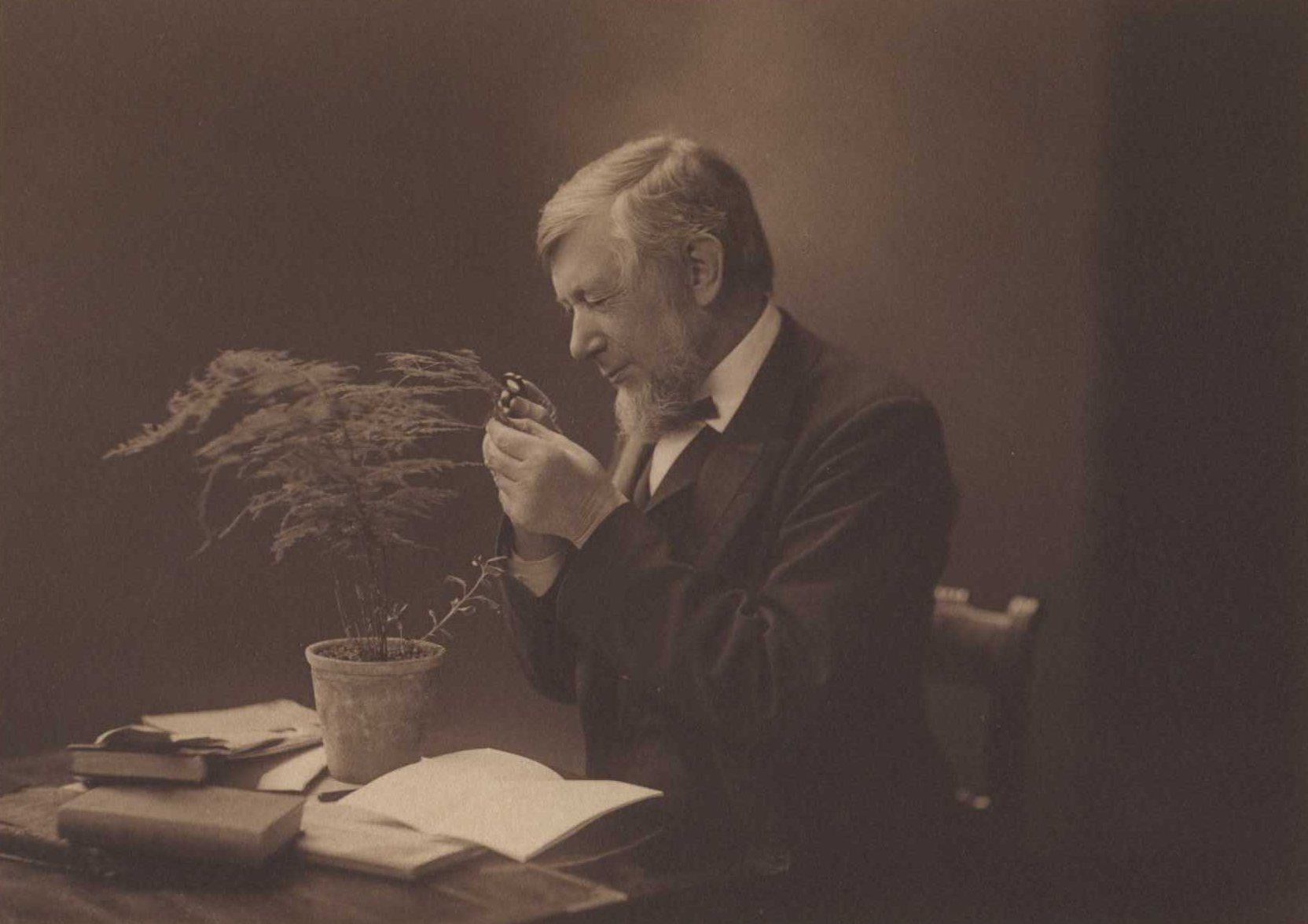
A picture of Baker (undated, but before 1906)

- Baker, J. G. (1874). "Revision of the Genera and Species of Tulipeae". Botanical Journal of the Linnean Society. xiv (76): 211–310. doi:10.1111/j.1095-8339.1874.tb00314.x.
- Baker, John Gilbert (1874). "A Classified Synonymic List of all the Known Crocuses, with their Native Countries, and References to the Works where they are Figured". Journal of the Royal Horticultural Society of London. 4 (14): 111–119.
