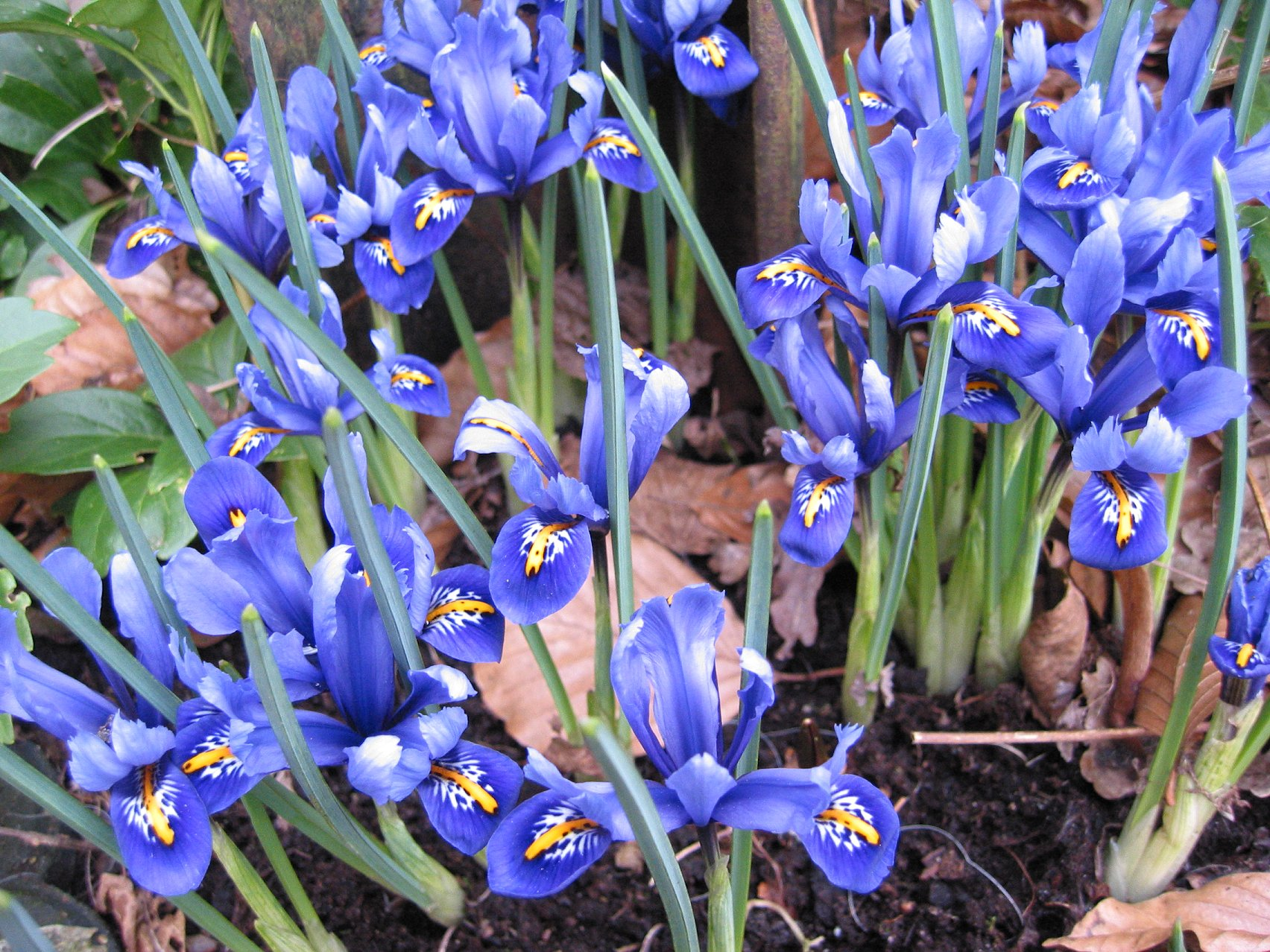

Scientific classification
- Kingdom: Plantae
- Clade: Embryophytes
- Clade: Tracheophytes
- Clade: Spermatophytes
- Clade: Angiosperms
- Clade: Monocots
- Order: Asparagales
- Family: Iridaceae
- Genus: Iris
- Subgenus: Iris subg. Hermodactyloides
- Section: Iris sect. Reticulatae
- Species: I. reticulata

Binomial name
- Iris reticulata M.Bieb.

Synonyms
- Iridodictyum hyrcanum (Woronow ex Grossh.) Rodion. [Invalid]; Iridodictyum reticulatum (M.Bieb.) Rodion.; Iris histrio var. atropurpurea (Dykes) Dykes; Iris hyrcana Woronow ex Grossh.; Iris reticulata var. atropurpurea Dykes; Iris reticulata var. cyanea Regel; Iris reticulata var. krelagei Regel; Iris reticulata var. reticulata (none known); Neubeckia reticulata (M.Bieb.) Alef.; Xiphion krelagii (Regel) Klatt; Xiphion reticulatum (M.Bieb.) Klatt

= Iris reticulata =

Flowering plant species in the iris family

Iris reticulata, the snow iris, netted iris, or golden netted iris, is a species of flowering plant in the family Iridaceae.

== Description ==
The reticulata group of irises is characterised by a fibrous net surrounding the bulb. They are small plants to 15 centimetres (5.9 in), with tubular, sharply-pointed, ribbed leaves, and flowers of yellow, blue or purple with an orange blaze on the falls, appearing in early spring. They are hardy, but prefer a well-drained sunny position in soil which dries out in summer; they are therefore suitable for a rock or gravel garden.

Iris reticulata has spherical to drop shaped bulbs, which are coated with a solid brown fibrous network.

The leaves appear after flowering, it has 10 cm (3.9 in) high stems.

In the Northern Hemisphere it blooms in the winter, between November and January, or sometimes in February. The flowers are around 2.5–3 cm (0.98–1.18 in) wide. The flowers are much smaller than those of other irises.

Like other irises, it has two types of tepals, three large sepals (outer petals), known as the "falls", and three inner, smaller petals known as the "standards". They come in shades of blue, from clear blue, to dark blue and purple. The falls have a bright yellow ridge, or orange mark.

== Distribution and habitat ==
Iris reticulata is native to temperate areas of western Asia from eastern Turkey to Iran, but cultivated widely in temperate regions.

=== Range ===
Found in the Hyrcanian woods, along the southern coast of the Caspian Sea from Azerbaijan to Iran.

=== Habitat ===
It is found growing in the mountains along the Caspian Sea.

== Cultivation ==
It prefers to grow in sunny sites, on rocky soils that dry out completely in summer.

It is not very hardy, but it can withstand strong frosts of short duration. Although it is thought to be best grown in the UK and in America, within a bulb frame or alpine house, to keep the soils dry. It also needs a dry, summer dormancy of several months.

A specimen of Iris hyrcana won the Farrer Medal at the AGS Caerleon Show, in South Wales, shown by Bob and Rannveig Wallis.

The following cultivars have received the Royal Horticultural Society's Award of Garden Merit:

- 'George' (purple)
- 'Katharine Hodgkin' (pale blue)
- 'Pixie' (deep blue)

There is a known variety called Iris reticulata var. bakeriana (also known as Iris bakeriana).

=== Biochemistry ===
As most irises are diploid, having two sets of chromosomes, this can be used to identify hybrids and classification of groupings. It was counted as 2n=20,

== Toxicity ==
Like many other irises, most parts of the plant are poisonous (rhizome and leaves), if mistakenly ingested can cause stomach pains and vomiting. Also handling the plant may cause a skin irritation or an allergic reaction.
