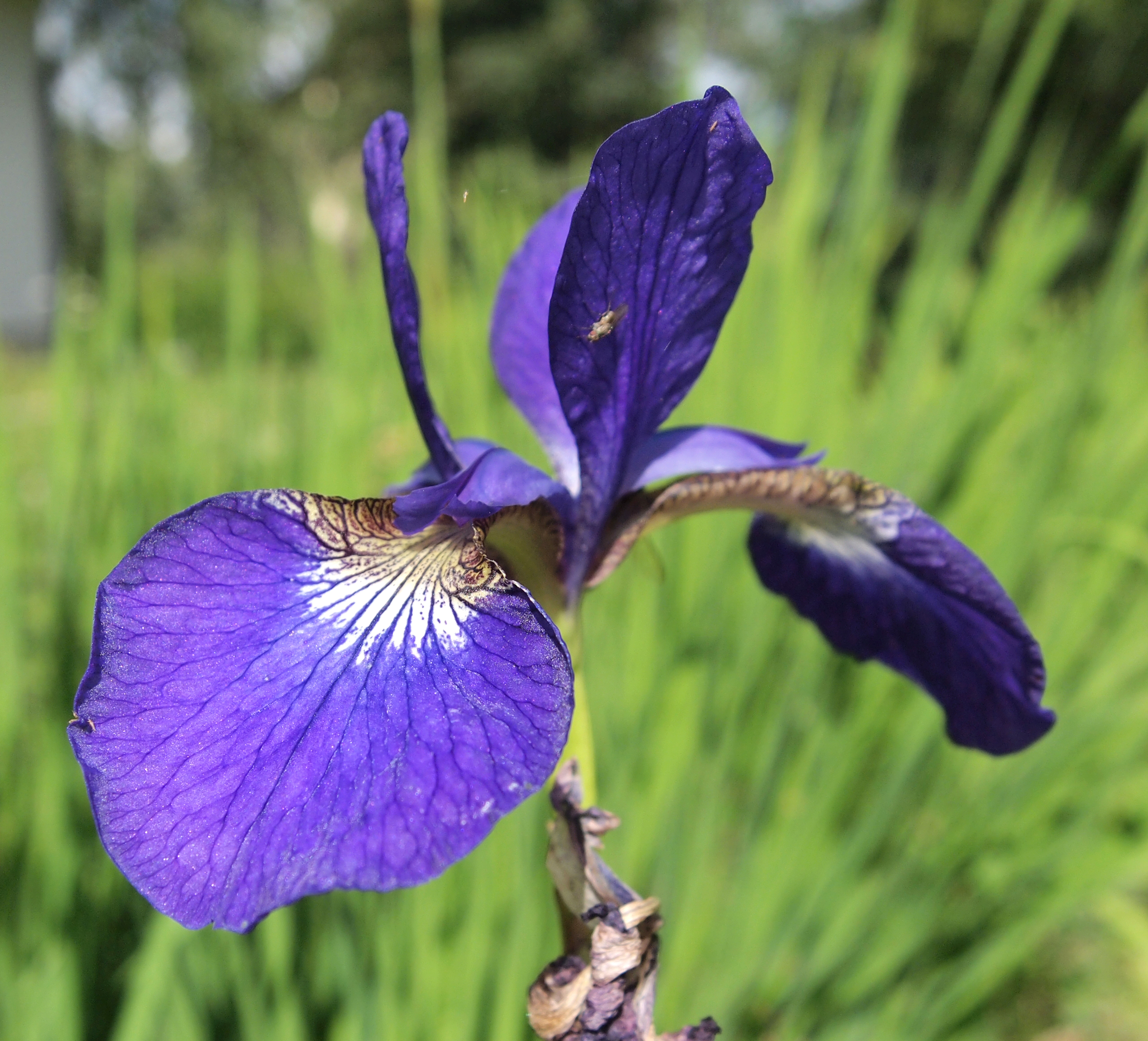
- Iris setosa

Scientific classification
- Kingdom: Plantae
- Clade: Tracheophytes
- Clade: Angiosperms
- Clade: Monocots
- Order: Asparagales
- Family: Iridaceae
- Genus: Iris
- Subgenus: Iris subg. Limniris
- Section: Iris sect. Limniris
- Series: Iris ser. Tripetalae (Diels) G.H.M.Lawr.

= Iris ser. Tripetalae =

Group of flowering plants

Iris ser. Tripetalae is a series of the genus Iris, in Iris subg. Limniris.

The series was first classified by Ludwig Diels in 'Die Natürlichen Pflanzenfamilien' (Edited by H. G. A. Engler and K. Prantl) in 1930. It was further expanded by George Hill Mathewson Lawrence in Gentes Herb (written in Dutch) in 1953.

The name of the series comes from the three petals of the flowers of the species in the series.

It has been theorised that the formation of the ice caps during the last ice age, led to the split of Iris tridentata from other forms in North America.

Most have small standards and violet-blue flowers, with darker veins on the large falls.

Only, Iris setosa is in cultivation, in the UK, and in the US.

They prefer lime-free soils and moist conditions. They are often used in hybridising with species of Iris ser. Sibiricae or Iris ser. Californicae.

Includes;

Image	Scientific name	Distribution
	Iris hookeri Penny – Hooker's iris	Northeastern United States and also eastern Canada.
	Iris setosa Pallas ex Link – beachhead iris	Alaska, Maine, Canada (including British Columbia, Newfoundland, Quebec and Yukon), Russia (including Siberia), northeastern Asia, China, Korea and southwards to Japan
	Iris tridentata Pursh – savanna iris	Southeastern United States
