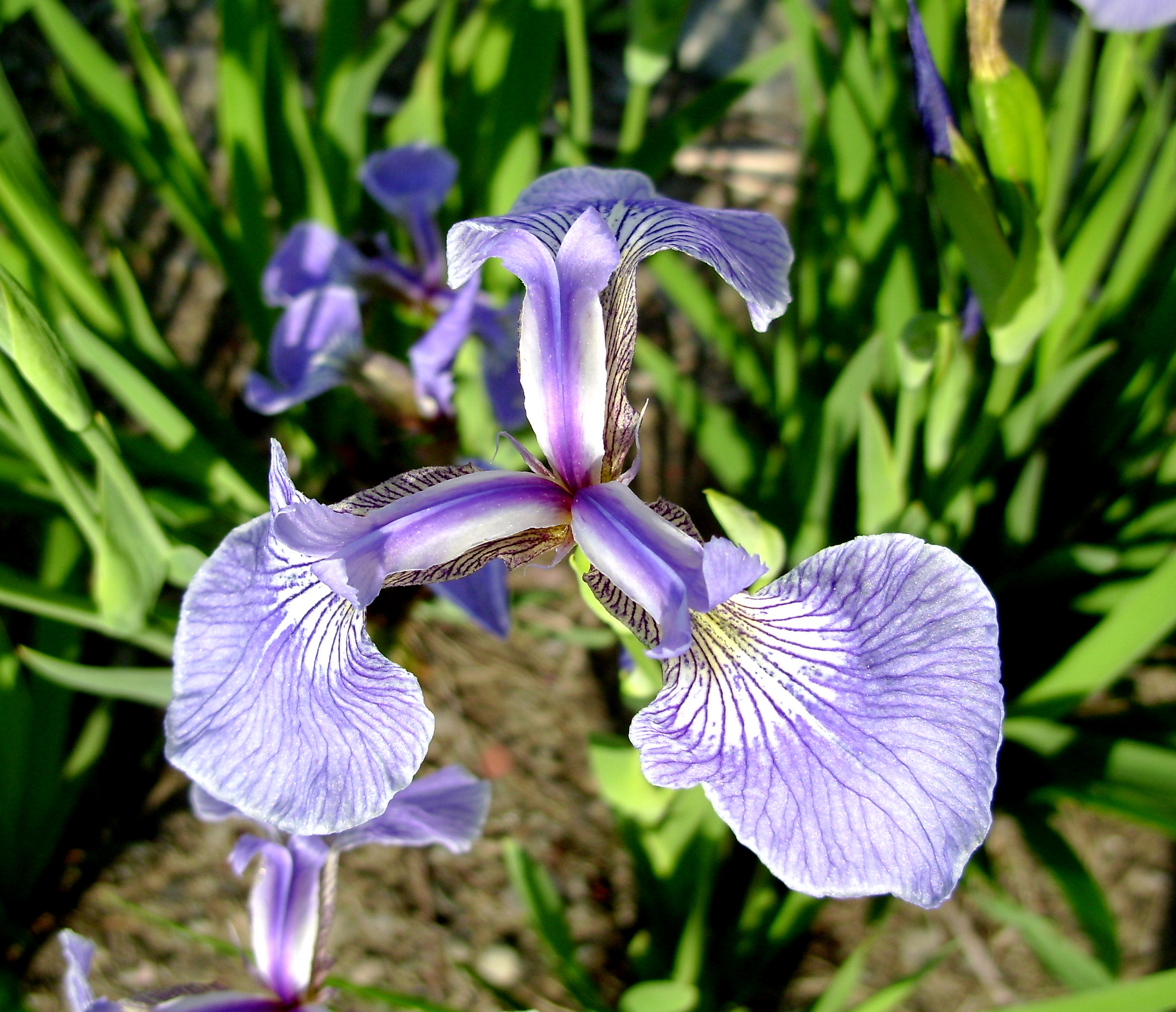

Scientific classification
- Kingdom: Plantae
- Clade: Tracheophytes
- Clade: Angiosperms
- Clade: Monocots
- Order: Asparagales
- Family: Iridaceae
- Genus: Iris
- Subgenus: Iris subg. Limniris
- Section: Iris sect. Limniris
- Series: Iris ser. Tripetalae
- Species: I. hookeri

Binomial name
- Iris hookeri George Penny ex G.Don

Synonyms
- Iris canadensis (Foster) Peckham; Iris hookeri f. hookeri; Iris hookeri f. pallidiflora (Fernald) Fernald; Iris hookeri f. zonalis (Eames) Fernald; Iris setosa var. canadensis Foster; Iris setosa f. pallidiflora Fernald; Iris setosa subsp. pygmaea C.E.Lundstr.; Iris setosa f. zonalis Eames; Iris tripetala Hook. [Illegitimate]; Xiphion tripetalum Alef. [Illegitimate]

= Iris hookeri =

Species of flowering plant

Iris hookeri, commonly called the beach head iris, is a species of Iris. It is endemic to sea coasts and beaches in Maine, in the Northeastern United States and also eastern Canada.

It blooms in July.

It was first published by the English botanist George Penny in Hort. Brit. (edited by J.C.Loudon), edition 2 on page 591 in 1832, based on an earlier description by George Don.

The Latin specific epithet hookeri refers to the English botanist William Jackson Hooker.

It is found in Eastern Canada within the states of Québec, Nova Scotia, Prince Edward Island, New Brunswick, Newfoundland and Labrador.

It was verified by United States Department of Agriculture and the Agricultural Research Service on 4 April 2003, and as being an accepted name by the RHS.
