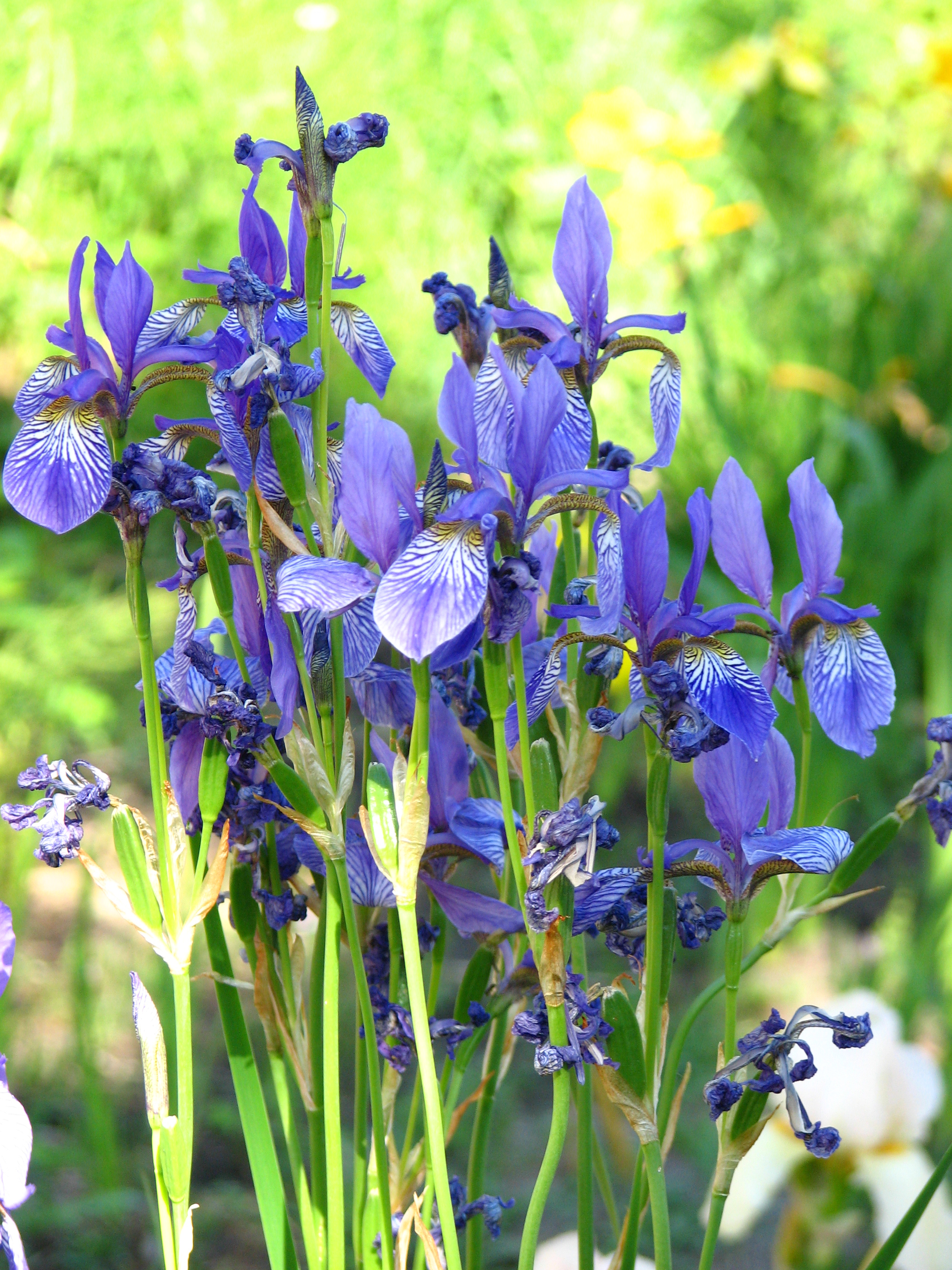
- Iris sibirica

Scientific classification
- Kingdom: Plantae
- Clade: Tracheophytes
- Clade: Angiosperms
- Clade: Monocots
- Order: Asparagales
- Family: Iridaceae
- Genus: Iris
- Subgenus: Iris subg. Limniris
- Section: Iris sect. Limniris
- Series: Iris ser. Sibiricae

= Iris ser. Sibiricae =

Group of flowering plants

Iris ser. Sibiricae is a series of flowering plants in the genus Iris, subgenus Limniris.

The series was first classified by Diels in 'Die Natürlichen Pflanzenfamilien' (edited by H. G. A. Engler and K. Prantl) in 1930. It was further expanded by Lawrence in Gentes Herb (written in Dutch) in 1953.

Iris sibirica and Iris sanguinea were first recorded and described in the 18th century, but date back in Europe before that. They were used in herbal remedies, to cure ulcers, remove freckles and cure other women's problems. In the 19th century, they began to be used more as garden plants, and new hybrids were developed. In the 1920s and 1930s, American breeders also started creating new hybrids.

Most species are easy to grow in temperate zones (including the UK). They prefer semi-shaded positions, that contain moisture during the summer. They also need soils with a pH level of more than 7.

In the 1970s, the Society for Siberian Irises in North America did some chromosomal research into the series and found that the series was divided into two groups. One had 40 chromosomes (such as Iris chysographes) while the other had just 28 chromosomes (such as Iris sibirica). It was published by L.W.Lenz in 'Aliso' in 1976.

The society then decided to divide the group by this division. The 40 chromosomal group is sometimes known as the 'Sino-Siberians' (based on the native origin of most of the group).

The Sino-siberians include; Iris bulleyana, Iris chrysographes, Iris clarkei, Iris delavayi, Iris forrestii and Iris wilsonii. The 28 chromosomal group contains Iris sanguinea, Iris sibirica and Iris typhifolia.

The Morgan-Wood Medal has been awarded by the American Iris Society since 1951. It honours the work of F. Cleveland Morgan (1882-1962) and Ira E. Wood (1903-1977). It is given to those Siberian irises judged to be the best of the best in that year.

The series includes:-

- Iris bulleyana Dykes
- Iris chrysographes – black iris
- Iris clarkei Baker
- Iris delavayi Micheli
- Iris forrestii Dykes
- Iris sanguinea Hornem. ex Donn – blood iris, ayame (Japanese)
- Iris sibirica – Siberian iris
- Iris typhifolia Kitag.
- Iris wilsonii C.H.Wright
