= William Rickatson Dykes =

English botanist (1877–1925)

- Born: 4 November 1877; Bayswater, London, UK
- Died: 1 December 1925 (aged 48); Woking, Surrey, UK
- Education: Wadham College, Oxford
- Known for: Taxonomy; Botany
- Spouse: Elsie Katherine Dykes (died 1933)
- Awards: Veitch Memorial Medal (1924), Victoria Medal of Honor (1925)
- Scientific career
- Fields: Botany
- Academic advisors: Sir Michael Foster
- Author abbrev. (botany): Dykes

William Rickatson Dykes (4 November 1877 – 1 December 1925) was an English amateur botanist who became an expert in the field of iris breeding and wrote several influential books on the subject. He was also interested in tulips, amaryllis, and other plants.

== Early life and education ==
William Rickatson Dykes was born on 4 November 1877 at Bayswater in London, the second son of Alfred Dykes. He was a clever student and a talented athlete who attended City of London School and then Wadham College, Oxford. In 1900, he obtained an M.A. in classics. Later he received a licence ès lettres from the University of Paris (Sorbonne).

Between 1903 and 1919, Dykes was a schoolmaster at Charterhouse School in Godalming. He taught Greek and Latin and occasionally football.

== Botanical work ==
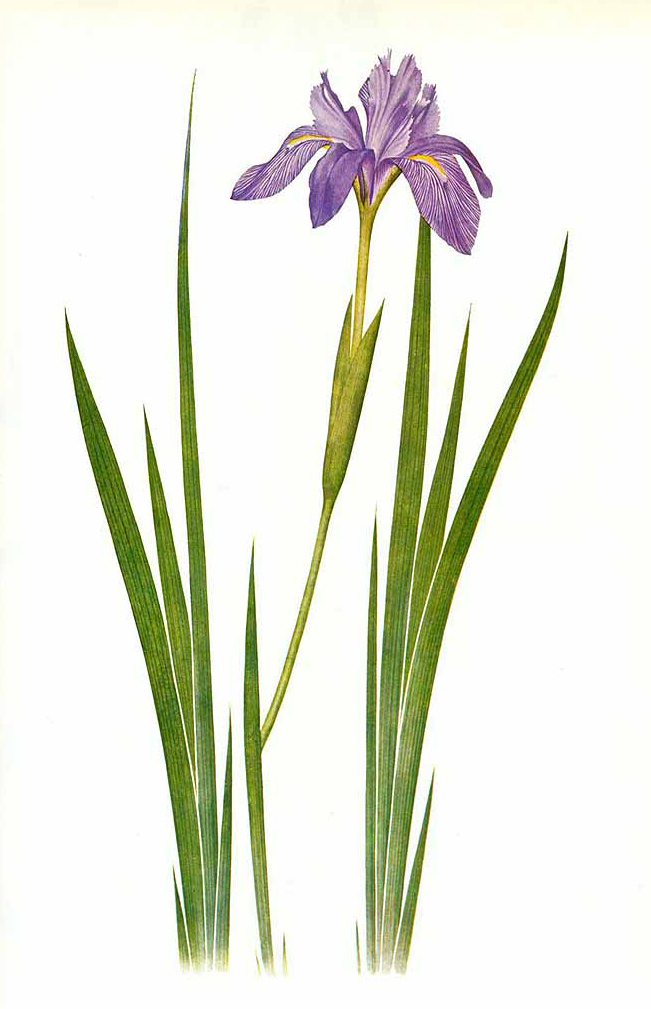
Watercolor of Iris nepalensis (now known as Iris decora ) by F.H. Round for William Rickatson Dykes, The Genus Iris, 1913 (plate 39).

While studying at Oxford, Dykes had met Sir Michael Foster, who instilled in him a passion for studying irises. After he moved to Godalming, he created a large garden to grow irises. When Foster died in 1907, Dykes received the loan of a large collection of Foster's notes for a comprehensive study of irises that he had been unable to complete before his death. Dykes took over this study and completed it, a process that formed the basis for his first book, Irises (1909), a volume in the series Present-Day Gardening. A smallish book, it focuses on the decorative uses of the iris as a garden plant but also contains plenty of scientific information.

By 1910, Dykes was being interviewed by Garden Life magazine as an expert amateur and recognised authority on iris cultivation. In his own garden, he had developed an extensive collection embracing most known species. He had several bulb frames.

In 1911, Dykes travelled to the South of France, in Hyères in Var, in search of irises that he had read about, where he discovered Iris spuria var. maritima. It was later published in his 1913 book The Genus Iris. During this period, he also worked with retired engineer and plant breeder Arthur J. Bliss (1862–1931) to breed several hybrids.

Dykes undertook a formal study of the iris genus at the botanical library at Kew Gardens Herbarium. He also examined hundreds of iris species specimens at other collections, including the British Museum, Oxford Botanical Garden, Cambridge Botanic Garden, Edinburgh Botanic Garden, Berlin Botanical Garden, Vienna Hofmuseum and Jardin des plantes. In 1913, he published his second book, The Genus Iris, in which he created the first classification of irises according to Linnaeus's botanical system. In 1924, he was awarded the Veitch Memorial Medal in recognition of the importance of this book in the field of horticulture. Although a landmark in its day, it is now considered out-of-date taxonomically. Iris classification was improved by George H.M. Lawrence (in 1953), then by Georgi Rodionenko (in 1961) and Brian Mathew (in 1981).

The Genus Iris had 48 full-color plates made from watercolors by F.H. Round and painted from plants in Dykes's own garden. Dykes knew Round because he was an assistant drawing master at Charterhouse. Round later commented that, during iris season, Dykes would show up "in his dressing gown" at 5 in the morning with an iris in hand, expecting the painting to be made immediately while the bloom was still fresh. He said that the drawings for Dykes "were easy and comfortable to do."

In April 1913, Dykes took a trip to Dalmatian coast, visiting Sarajevo, Clissa, Mostar and Bosnia. He walked and climbed to collect specimens of irises, which he had heard about from other collectors and sources.

In 1914, he published his third book on irises, Handbook of Garden Irises. It contains a large amount of information on iris species. That same year, he was interviewed by Country Life magazine on the subject of iris, discussing such species as Iris xiphiodes (the English iris), Junos, and Iris reticulata.

In November 1919, he became a fellow of the Linnean Society of London. The following year, he was appointed to the Secretaryship of the Royal Horticultural Society, a position he devoted himself to until 1925. As a result of this appointment, it became necessary for him to leave Godalming and live nearer to London. He made arrangements for nearly all of his collection of irises to be moved to Percy Murrell's Nursery at Orpington in Kent. He retained only a few rhizomes each of some seedlings, planting them on a small plot of ground at the John Innes Research Station at Merton, Surrey. During this period, he raised several hybrid iris seedlings of which 'Amber' (pale yellow, 1924), 'Moonlight' (yellowish-white) and 'Wedgewood' (medium blue) are the best known. He also carried on correspondence with many botanists and gardeners, including the American Grace Sturtevant.

In 1924, Dykes married Elsie K. "Katherine" (née Kaye), who also made a name for herself as an iris hybridiser and painter. They had their own garden at Sutton Green near Guildford, where he planted over 30,000 tulip bulbs.

In 1925, Dykes translated from the French Louis Lorette's book on pruning fruit trees, La Taille Lorette.

That same year, Dykes was killed only a week after receiving the Victoria Medal of Honour from the RHS. On 27 November 1925, his car skidded on a slippery road and he crashed into a truck. The impact ejected him from his vehicle and he was so severely injured that he died a few days later on 1 December.

== Posthumous honours ==
In June 1926, at a meeting of the British Iris Society, it was resolved to award a medal to the hybridiser of the outstanding iris variety of each year in memory of Mr. Dykes. The Dykes Medal was first presented in 1927 to William Mohr for his 'San Francisco' hybrid. Since then, it has become highly coveted by all iris hybridizers. The British Iris Society currently presents separate Dykes Medals in Great Britain, Australia, and New Zealand. It was previously awarded in France as well beginning in 1928, but it stopped in 1938 due to the outbreak of the Second World War and never started up afterwards.

Katherine Dykes carried on her husband's plant breeding work, and in 1926, she named a yellow iris (the first true yellow) 'W. R. Dykes' in his honour. It was sold by Orpington Nurseries and was used by other iris breeders to create new hybrids. In 1930, she produced the iris 'Gudrun' (a white), which went on to win the Dykes Medal in 1931. She died in Raynes Park on 25 May 1933 after a train accident.

In June 1926, Marion Cran wrote in the Dykes memorial issue of the Annual of the Iris Society, "He was to be seen at all the shows, the small fortnightly shows at Vincent Square and the great summer and autumn shows at Chelsea and Holland Park. His broad, burly frame moved in a leisurely way among the exhibits. He might be smiling just broadly like a merry schoolboy, or cross as Good Friday's bun just as the moment might take him; for he was a man of strong personality who made no attempt to disguise his emotions. Some have suggested he had Asperger syndrome.

Two posthumous publications by Dykes came out in 1930. Dykes's Notes on Tulip Species included fifty-four colour plates of paintings by Elsie Katherine Dykes and notes by Mr. Dykes.Dykes on Irises (edited by G. Dillistone) was a reprint of Dykes's contributions to various journals and periodicals during the last 20 years of his life.

In 1932, Otto Stapf from Kew Gardens found a hybrid between Iris chrysographes and Iris delavayi in Dykes's garden and named it Iris dykesii in his honour. The name did not stick as the iris was subsequently reclassified as a synonym of Iris chrysographes (Dykes), which Dykes had originally published in Gardeners Chronicles in 1911. In 1935, Alexei Vedenski named a tulip Tulipa dykesiana in Flora of USSR; this too has since been reclassified, in this case as a synonym of Tulipa kolpakowskiana (Regel).

== Other sources ==
- Irises and the Men and Women who Created Them, Clarence E. Mahan
