= Ansan Reed Marshy Park =

Wetland park in Ansan, South Korea

- 안산갈대습지공원
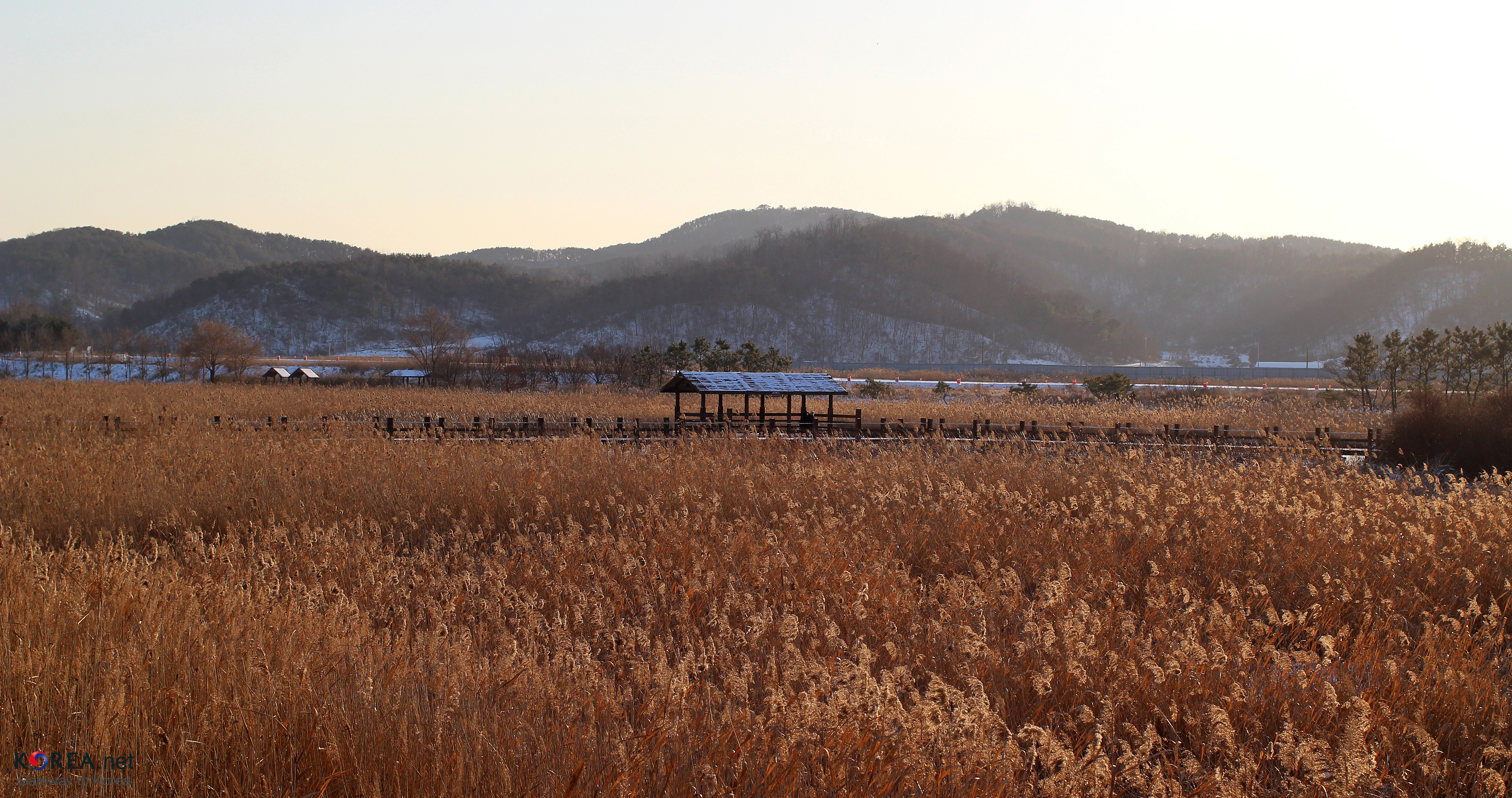
- Ansan Reed Marshy Park, 2013
- Interactive map of Ansan Reed Marshy Park
- Type: wetland park
- Location: 820-116 Haean-ro, Sangnok-gu, Ansan-si, Gyeonggi-do
- Coordinates: 37°16′12″N 126°50′35″E
- Opened: December 2005
- Website: wetland.ansan.go.kr/index.php

Korean name
- Hangul: 안산갈대습지공원
- Hanja: 安山갈대濕地公園
- RR: Ansan galdae seupji gongwon
- MR: Ansan kaltae sŭpchi kongwŏn

Ansan Reed Marshy Park (Korean: 안산갈대습지공원) is a wetland park located in Sadong, Sangnok District, Ansan-si, Gyeonggi Province, South Korea.

As the first man-made wetland in Korea, the park which began construction in 1997 and was completed in December 2005, was originally called Sihwa Lake Wetland Park, but in April 2014, the jurisdiction of the park was divided between Ansan City and Hwaseong City from the Korea Water Resources Corporation, the part of Ansan City is called Ansan Reed Marshy Park, and the part of Hwaseong City is called Bibong Marshy Park. Since 2014, the Ansan Reed Park has been promoted for inclusion in the Ramsar site, which is a measure for the restoration of the Ecosystem of Lake Sihwa.

== Background ==
Under the Sihwa District Reclamation Project Plan, which aims to expand Ansan Smart Hub and agricultural land, the area, formerly called Gunja Bay, was constructed as the Sihwa SeaWall from 1987 to 1994. As the seawall impounded the water and turned it into a freshwater lake, factory wastewater and domestic sewage accumulated. The water quality rapidly deteriorated, with an average of 17.4 parts per million (ppm) of Chemical Oxygen Demand (COD), far exceeding the agricultural water standard of 8 ppm, and some spots exceeding 80 ppm, leading to the death of many organisms.

It was nicknamed the “Lake of Death” and criticized by local residents and public opinion for destroying the ecosystem. A subsequent audit by the Board of Audit and Inspection found that 6979 wastewater pipes were poorly constructed due to KWRA's lack of supervision, resulting in an average of 7,000 tons of wastewater being discharged per day, and that Ansan City's sewage treatment plant was also poorly operated, resulting in the discharge of wastewater, which the KWRA had underestimated in its environmental impact assessment at 5.7 ppm. This led to the disciplinary action of 14 officials from the Korea Water Resources Corporation, Ansan City, the Han River Basin Environment Agency, and the Ministry of Construction and Transportation. The next step was to save Sihwa Lake. As a measure to improve water quality, the government will expand sewage treatment plants, conduct a pilot seawater distribution through drainage gates, and create an artificial wetland area upstream of Sihwa Lake.

== Construction ==
Korea Water Resources Corporation (KWRC) built the wetland at a cost of KRW 26.8 billion on 1.03 million square meters upstream of Sihwa Lake, where Banwolcheon, Donghwacheon, and Samhwacheon streams meet. The purpose was to treat wastewater from the three rivers by using the natural purification function of the wetland, and also to cultivate endangered native vegetation and utilize it as a habitat for wildlife.

== Description ==
In the center of the wetland is an artificial island where wildlife can rest, and around it is a deep, reed-free area of underwater plants and wildlife activity. The two-story, 160-square-meter ecology center consists of an exhibition hall and an observation deck, and in front of the ecology center is an ecological pond where the purified water from the wetland finally exits. Iris sanguinea, Japanese iris, and Nymphaea tetragona bloom around the pond. There is a wildflower path planted with various trees and wildflowers, and a 1.7-kilometer trail to observe the wetland. You can observe migratory birds such as ducks, black-crowned night heron, black-winged stilt and eastern great egret.

In April 2014, the Korea Water Resources Corporation handed over 641,815m^{2} to Hwaseong City and 396,685m2 to Ansan City, the former jurisdiction. The park was thus divided into Ansan Reedbed Wetland Park and Bibong Wetland Park.

== Impact ==
=== Ecosystem recovery ===
In 2014, 2,929 individuals of 111 bird species were observed, including 11 natural monuments and 9 endangered species, such as the common kestrel and mandarin duck, as well as boreal digging frog, Seoul frog, leopard cat, water deer and raccoon dogs, which are classified as class 2 endangered, and Eurasian otter which is class 1 endangered. The fact that it has become a home for these animals is a testament to the abundance of food and the improvement of the surrounding environment. This recovery has led to the city of Ansan applying to register the wetland as a Ramsar site.

== Criticism and controversy ==
=== Conflict over artificial pump operating costs between municipalities ===
Originally owned by Korea Water Resources Corporation, the neighboring local governments agreed to prioritize water quality management of Sihwa Lake at the time of its creation. However, in April 2014, the KWE handed over 641,815 square meters to Hwaseong City and 396,685 square meters to Ansan City, the former jurisdictions. The wetland is at a higher elevation than the tributary streams, so it is supplied with water through artificial pumps. However, while most of the marshland was given to Ansan City, the pump was located in Hwaseong City, and Hwaseong City demanded about 1.6 million won per month in maintenance costs such as pump power as a condition for operating the pump station. In response, Ansan City argued that there was no legal basis to pay for Hwaseong City's facilities, and Hwaseong City countered that it was impossible, threatening to close the pump station. In the end, the Water Resources Corporation agreed to pay until the end of October 2014, but there is still no solution. The two cities also have different ideas on how to manage the wetland, with Ansan City seeking to register it as a Ramsar site, while Hwaseong City is promoting a project to link it with the nearby Universal Studio South Korea. Hwaseong City, which is concerned about development restrictions imposed by the Ramsar designation, is opposed to the wetland's designation, which could prolong the conflict. The Water Resources Corporation's support has ended, and while Hwaseong City is operating the wetland to prevent the reeds from dying, Ansan City plans to build its own artificial pumps if it eventually closes it.

== Gallery ==
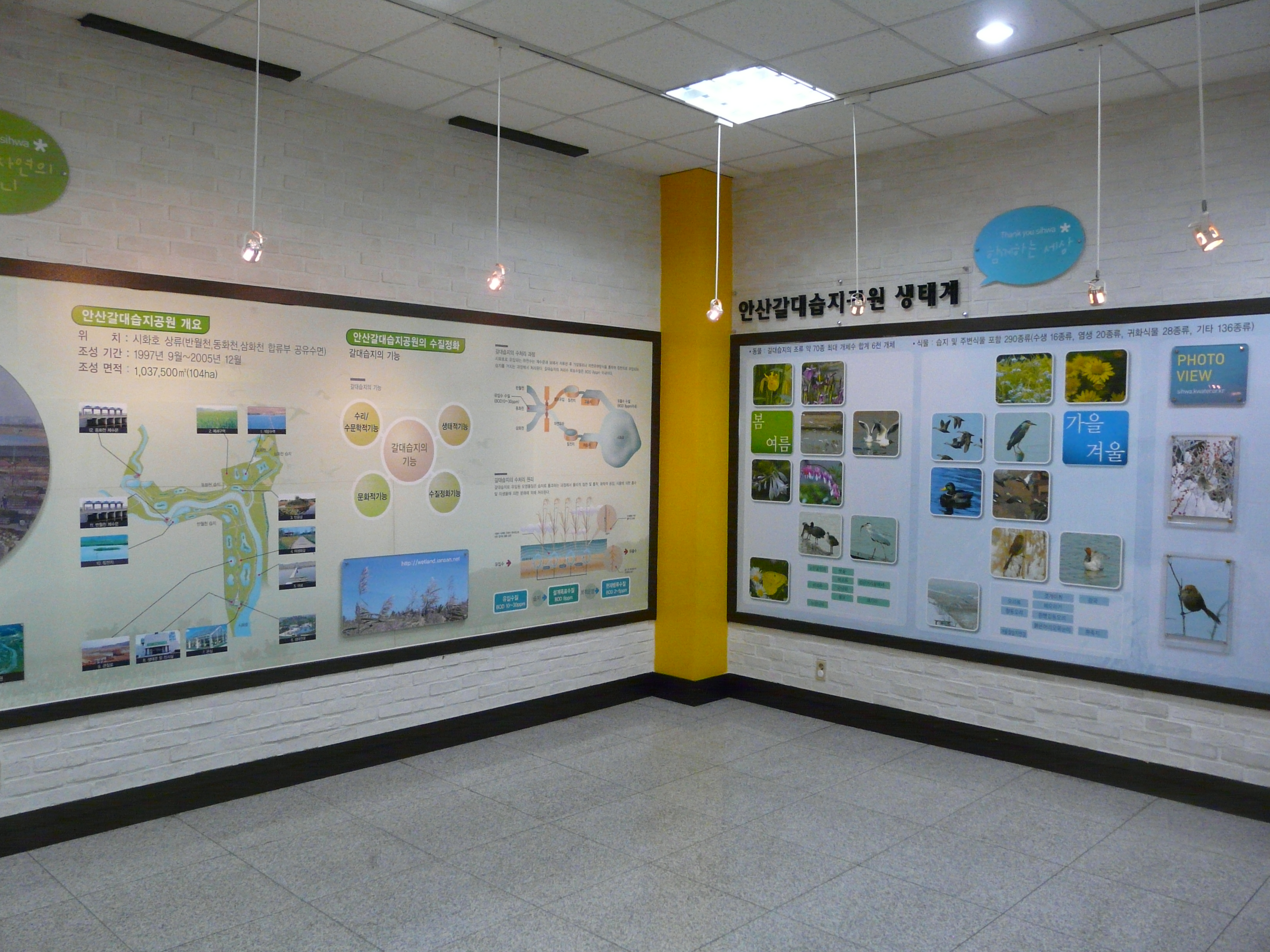

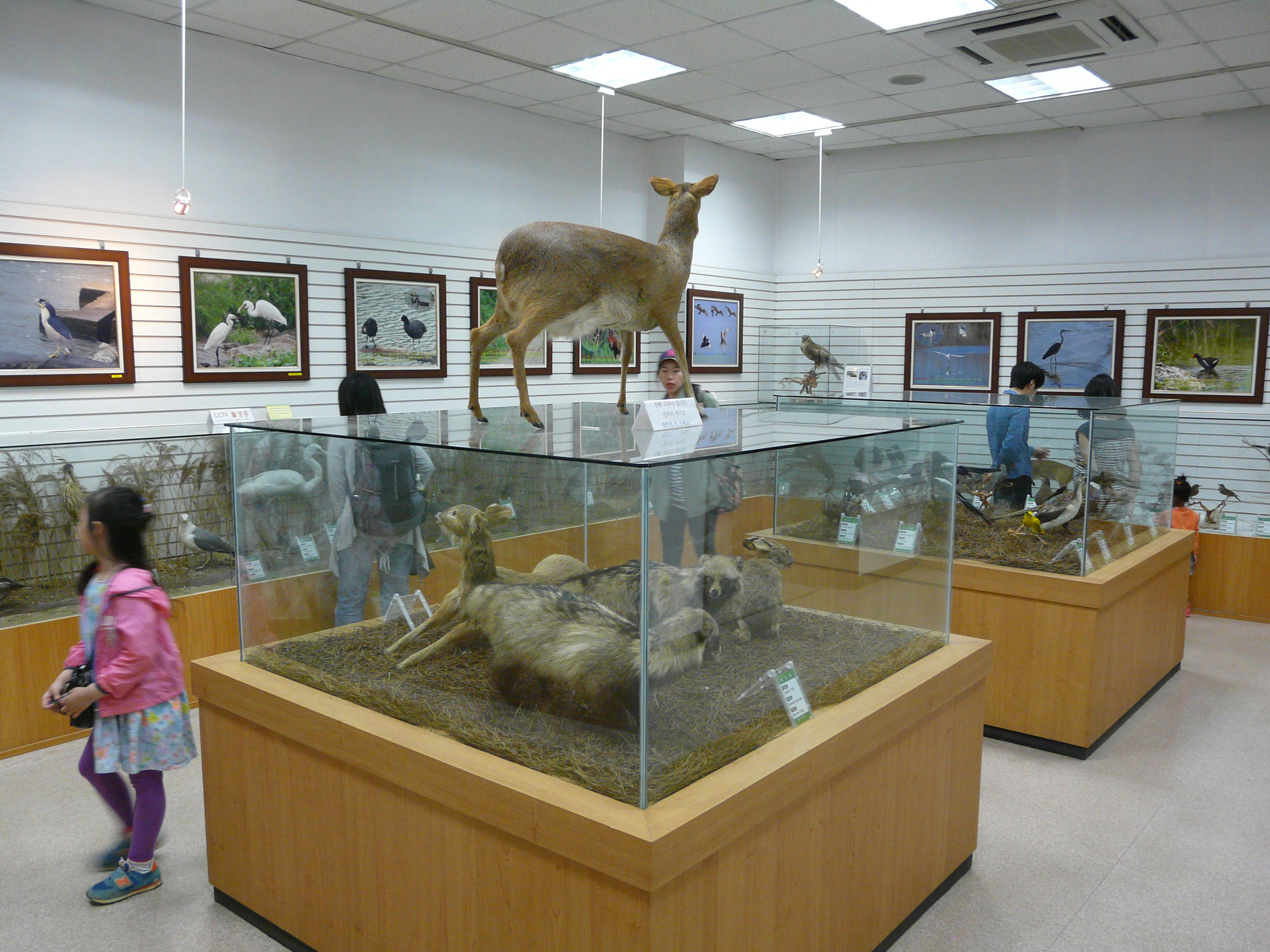

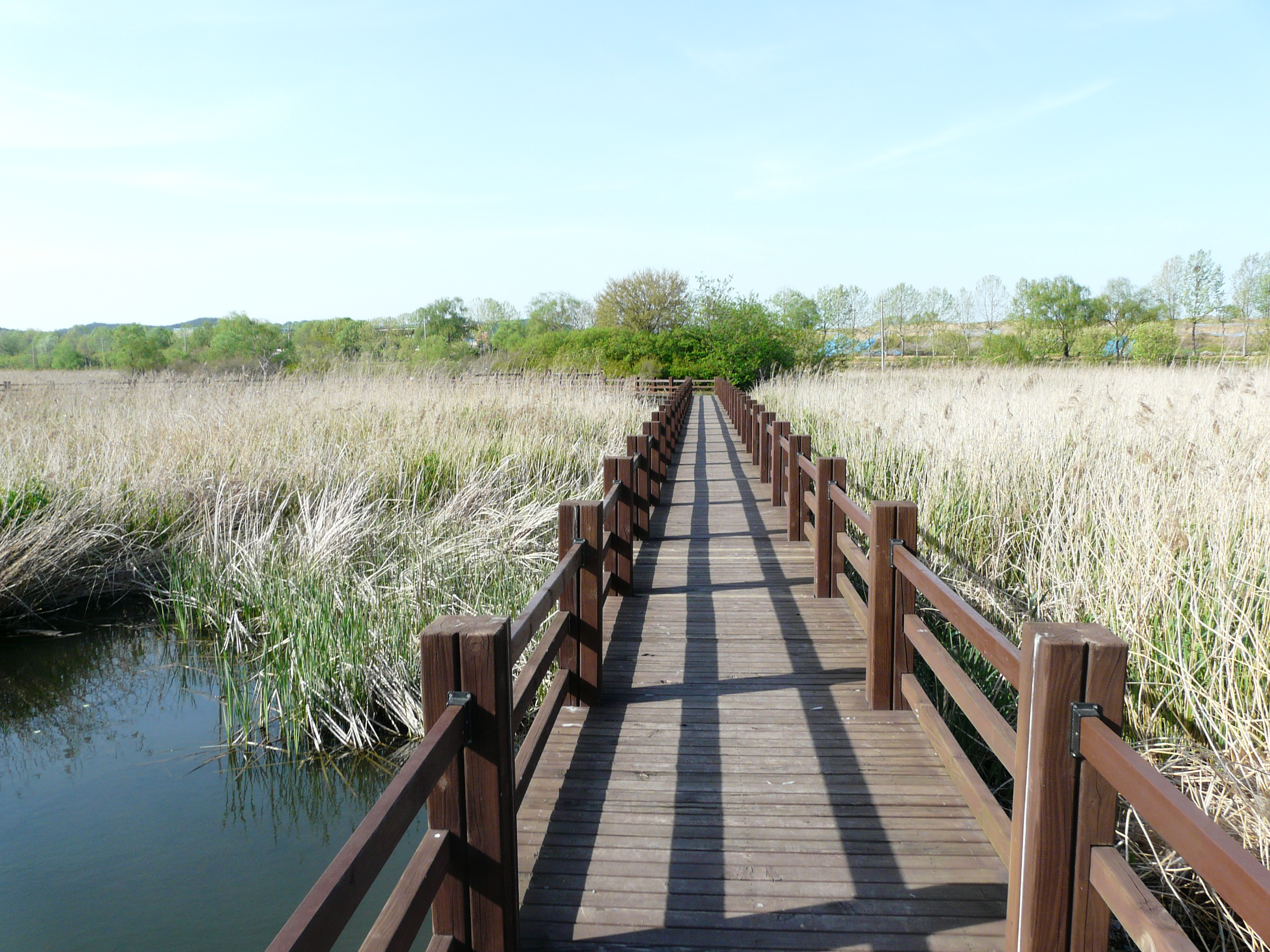

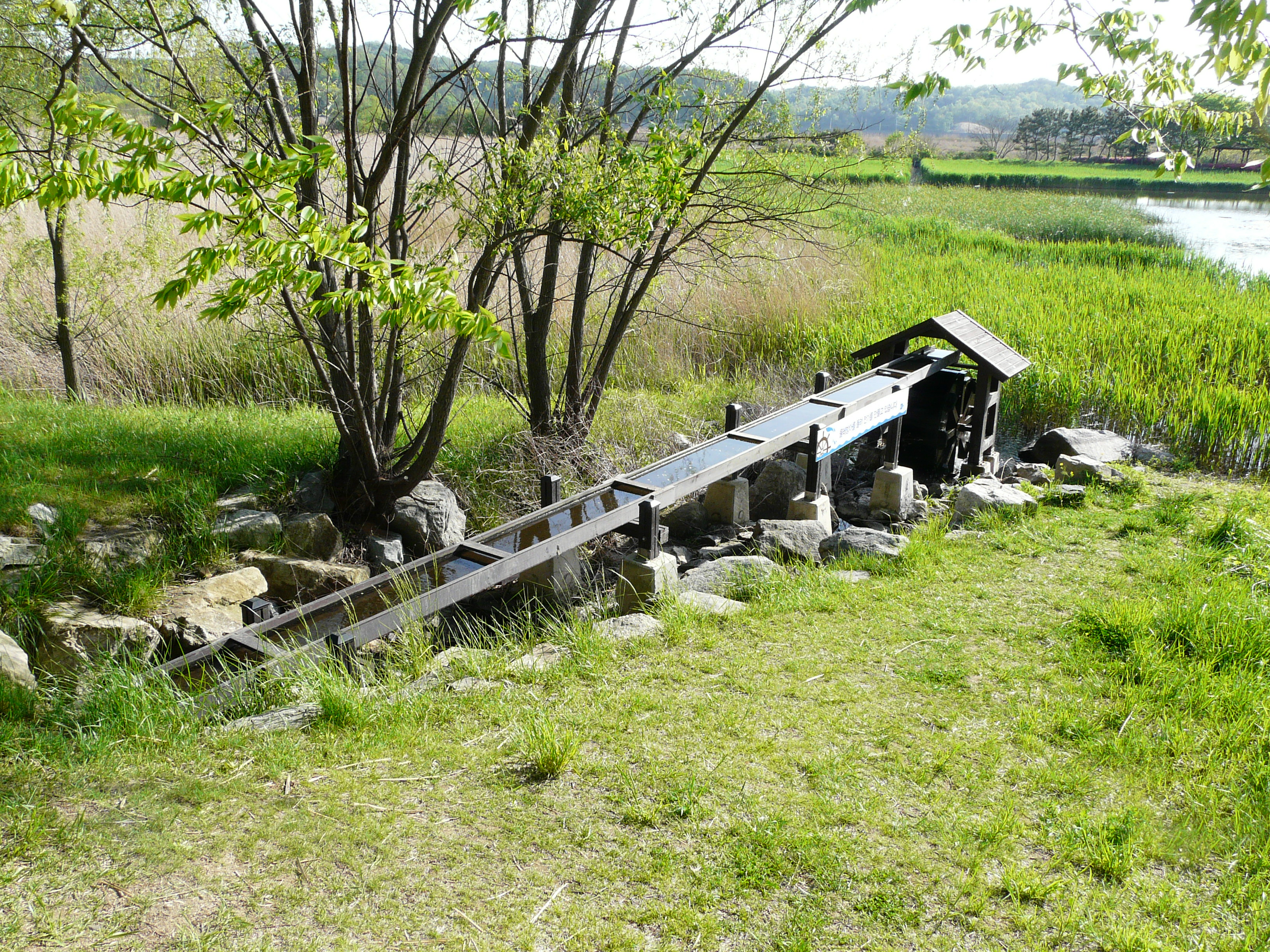

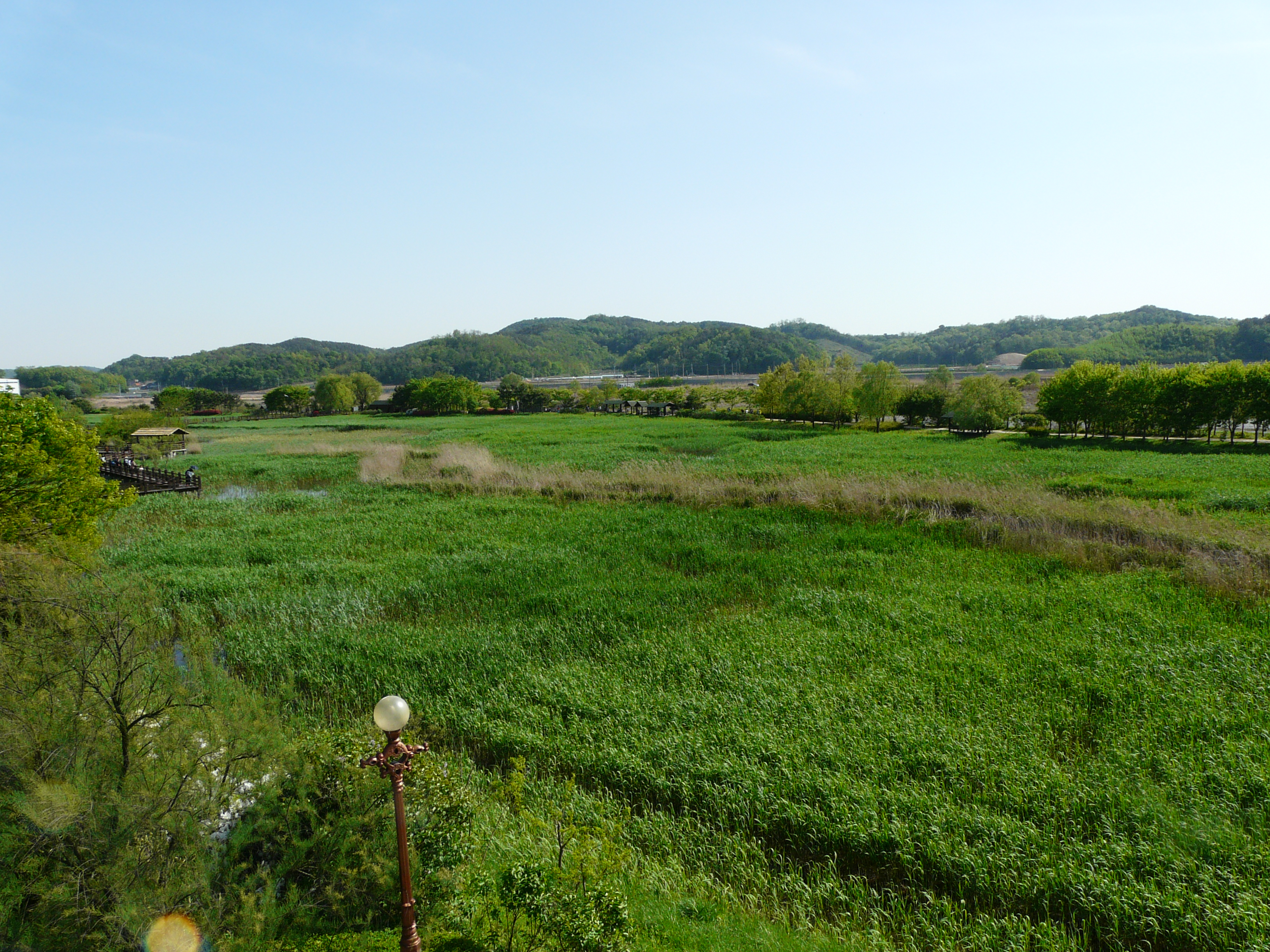

== See also ==
- Sihwa Lake Tidal Power Station
- Hwaseong Heroes Baseball Park
