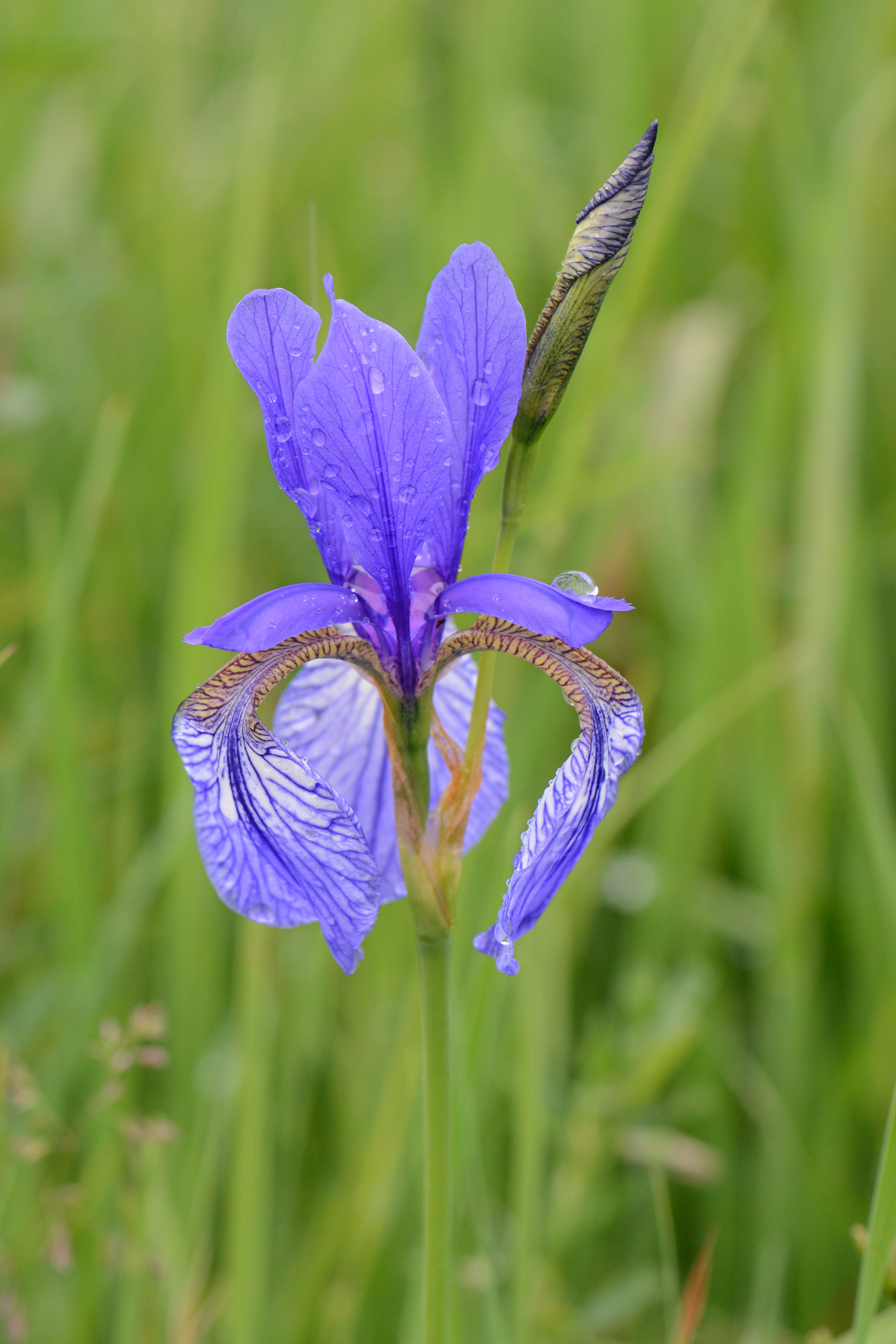

Scientific classification
- Kingdom: Plantae
- Clade: Tracheophytes
- Clade: Angiosperms
- Clade: Monocots
- Order: Asparagales
- Family: Iridaceae
- Genus: Iris
- Subgenus: Iris subg. Limniris
- Section: Iris sect. Limniris
- Series: Iris ser. Sibiricae
- Species: I. sibirica

Binomial name
- Iris sibirica L.

Synonyms
- Iris acuta Willd.; Iris angustifolia Gilib. [Invalid]; Iris bicolor Mill.; Iris erirrhiza Posp.; Iris flexuosa Murray; Iris mandraliscae Tineo ex Tornab. [Illegitimate]; Iris maritima Mill.; Iris pratensis Lam. [Illegitimate]; Iris pseudosibirica Schur; Iris sibirica var. acuta (Willd.) Trevir.; Iris sibirica f. albiflora Makino; Iris sibirica var. flexuosa (Murray) Baker; Iris sibirica f. stellata Makino; Iris spathulata Cav. [Illegitimate]; Iris stricta Moench; Limnirion sibiricum (L.) Opiz; Limniris sibirica (L.) Fuss; Xiphion flexuosum (Murray) Alef.; Xiphion pratense Parl.; Xiphion sibiricum (L.) Schrank; Xyridion flexuosum (Murray) Klatt; Xyridion sibiricum (L.) Klatt

= Iris sibirica =

Species of plant

Iris sibirica, commonly known as Siberian iris or Siberian flag, is a species of flowering plant in the family Iridaceae. It is a rhizomatous herbaceous perennial, from Europe (including France, Italy, Switzerland, Austria, Czech Republic, Slovakia, Germany, Hungary, Poland, Romania, Bulgaria, Former Yugoslavia, Belarus, Estonia, Latvia, Lithuania, Moldova, Ukraine and northern Turkey) and Central Asia (including Armenia, Azerbaijan and Siberia). It has long green grass-like leaves, tall stem, 2–5 violet-blue, to blue, and occasionally white flowers. It is cultivated as an ornamental plant in temperate regions.

== Description ==
Historically, Iris sibirica was often confused with Iris sanguinea and Iris typhifolia, similarly described blue-flowering Asian irises, which were traditionally distinguished by characteristics such as stem branching: I. sanguinea has unbranched stems, while I. sibirica has branched stems. However, a 2020 molecular and morphological study found no phylogenetic or consistent morphological distinction between I. sibirica, I. sanguinea and I. typhifolia, therefore synonymizing I. sanguinea and I. typhifolia with I. sibirica.

It has a creeping rhizome (approximately 0.9–1.2 cm (0.35–0.47 in) in diameter), forming a dense clumping plant. The rhizomes are covered with the brown remnants of old leaves from previous seasons.

It has green grass-like leaves, which are ribbed and can sometimes have a pink tinge at the base of the leaf. They can grow to between 25–80 cm (10–31 in) long and 0.4–0.6 cm (0.16–0.24 in) wide, normally shorter than the flowering stems. In Autumn, the foliage turns yellow and then dies back (in winter), to re-emerge in the spring.

It has a hollow, slender, 1–3 branched stem, that grows up to 50–120 cm (20–47 in) long. The stems bear 2–5 (normally three) flowers, at the terminal ends between late spring and early summer, between May and June.

It has 3 brown paper-like spathes (leaves of the flower bud), that are reddish at the base, measuring between 3–5 cm (1–2 in) long.

The flowers come in a range of blue shades. From violet-blue, to blue, and occasionally white. The flowers are 6–7 cm (2–3 in) in diameter.

It has 2 pairs of petals, 3 large sepals (outer petals), known as the 'falls' and 3 inner, smaller petals (or tepals), known as the 'standards'. The drooping obovate falls, measuring 5–7 cm (2.0–2.8 in) long and 2–2.5 cm wide, have a wide (or flaring) white blade or signal (central part of the petal) with dark-blue to violet veining. The white forms of the iris have a tinge of lavender and dark veining.

The smaller narrow upright standards are between 4.5–5 cm (1.8–2.0 in) long and 1.5–1.8 cm wide.

It has a light to dark blue-violet, circular perianth tube, about 1 cm long, pale blue style (about 4–5 cm (1.6–2.0 in) long), a pedicel between 1–15 cm long and a 1.5–2 cm roundly triangular, ovary.

After the iris has flowered, it produces a short stubby seed capsule, which is roundly triangular with low ridges at angles, measuring 3–4.5 cm by 1–1.3 cm. Inside the capsule, are 2 rows of seeds, which are thin, flat, shaped like a capital 'D' and dark brown seeds, measuring about 5 mm by 3 mm.

=== Biochemistry ===
It has been studied several times.

As most irises are diploid (having two sets of chromosomes), this can be used to identify hybrids and classification of groupings. It has been count various times; 2n=28, Sim. 1928; 2n=28, Skalinska, 1961; 2n=28, Wcislo, 1964; 2n=28 Baerji, 1970; 2n=28, Sharma, 1970; 2n=28; Lovka & Sus. 1971; 2n=28, Love in November 71, 2n=28, Pop.& Cesch. 1975,1976; 2n=28, Wetschnig, 1988; 2n=28, Malakhova & Markova, 1994. 2n=28 is the most common listed count. This means it is genetically similar to Iris sanguinea and Iris typhifolia.

== Taxonomy ==
Iris sibirica is pronounced as EYE-ris sy-BEER-ah-kuh.

It has the common names of Siberian Iris, or Siberian Flag (mainly in the UK).

It is known as iris de Sibérie (in French), sibirische Schwertlilie or Wiesen-Schwertlilie (in German) and strandiris (in Swedish).

It was called Iris augustifolia media by the 16th century Flemish botanist Carolus Clusius. It was collected in Siberia by monks in the Middle Ages and grown in monasteries, later it was distributed around Europe, where there are now many cultivars. It has been cultivated in Britain since 1596.

It was described and published by Carl Linnaeus in his book, Species Plantarum 1 39 on 1 May 1753, who renamed the iris Iris sibirica.

== Distribution and habitat ==
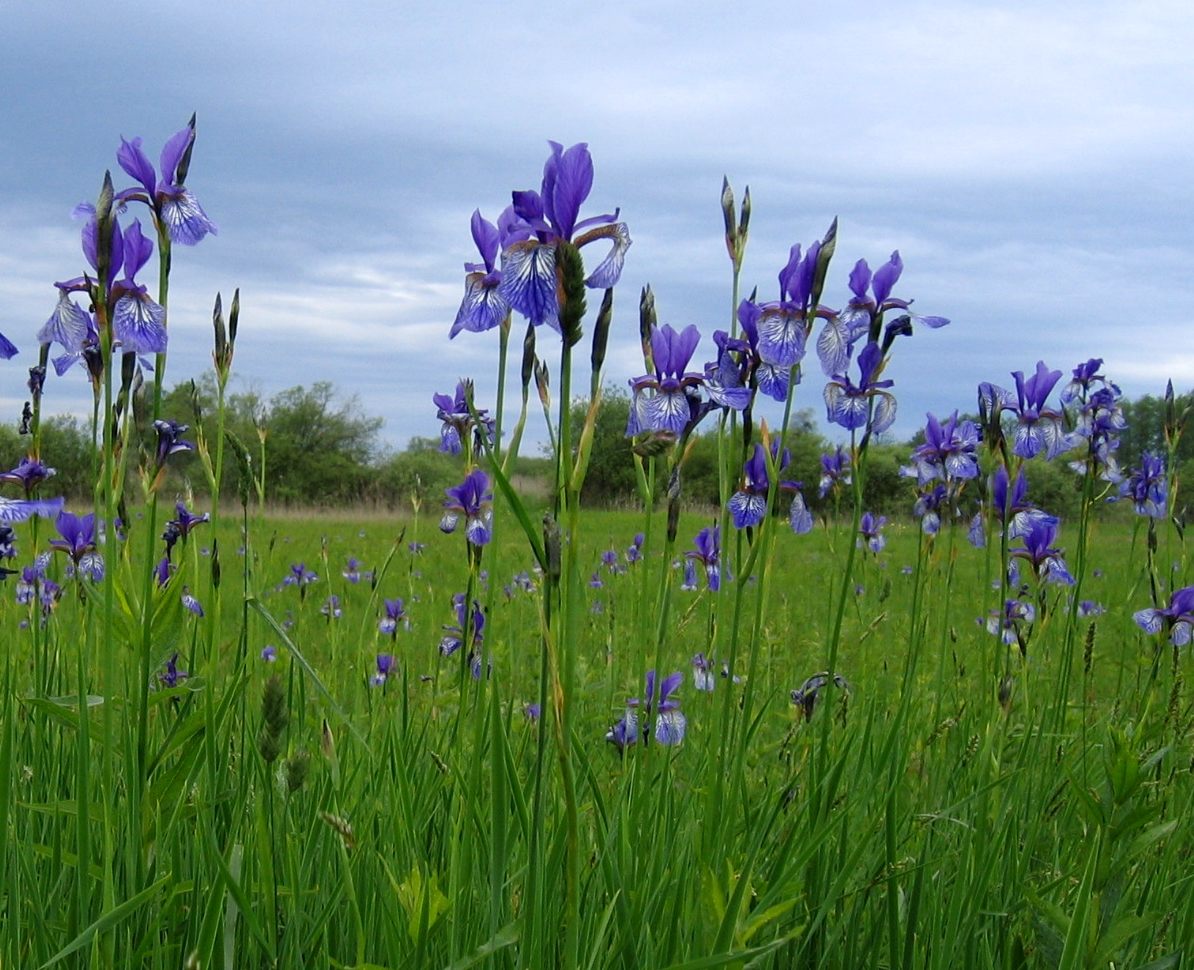
Iris sibirica growing in the grasslands of Germany

Iris sibirica is native to temperate areas between Europe and Central Asia. It has the widest distribution range of all the Siberian iris series.

=== Range ===
Within Europe, it is found in west France, Italy, Switzerland, Austria, Czech Republic and Slovakia, Germany, Hungary, Poland, Romania, Bulgaria, Former Yugoslavia, Belarus, Estonia, Latvia, Lithuania, Moldova, Ukraine and northern Turkey.

It is found in the Caucasus regions of Armenia, Azerbaijan and Siberia (of the Russia Federation). East to Lake Baikal (in Siberia).

It is listed with Iris bloudowii, Iris glaucescens, Iris humilis, Iris ruthenica, Iris tenuifolia and Iris tigridia as being found in the Altai-Sayan region (where Russia, China, Mongolia and Kazakhstan come together).

It has also been naturalized in various states of North America. Including Ontario (in Canada), Connecticut, Maine, Massachusetts, New York, Pennsylvania, Virginia and California.

=== Habitat ===
It is found growing in damp woodland, wet meadows, grasslands or pastures, reed swamps by lakes, and beside streams. They generally gain a lot of moisture from snow-melt of mountains, flooding streams and soaking areas beside them.

Within North America, it is found in the damp ditches beside roadsides.

== Conservation ==
According to IUCN Red List criteria, it is 'Vulnerable' (VU) (in the Czech Republic, Hungary, Ukraine) and it has become 'Extinct' in the Wild (EW) in Slovakia. In 2014, it was 'Vulnerable' in the Carpathian part of Slovakia. It is considered to be rare and endangered in Poland and not considered threatened in Romania.

The UK national collection of Siberian irises is kept by Alun and Jill Whitehead at Aulden Farm, 3 miles (4.8 km) south of Leominster in Herefordshire.

== Cultivation ==
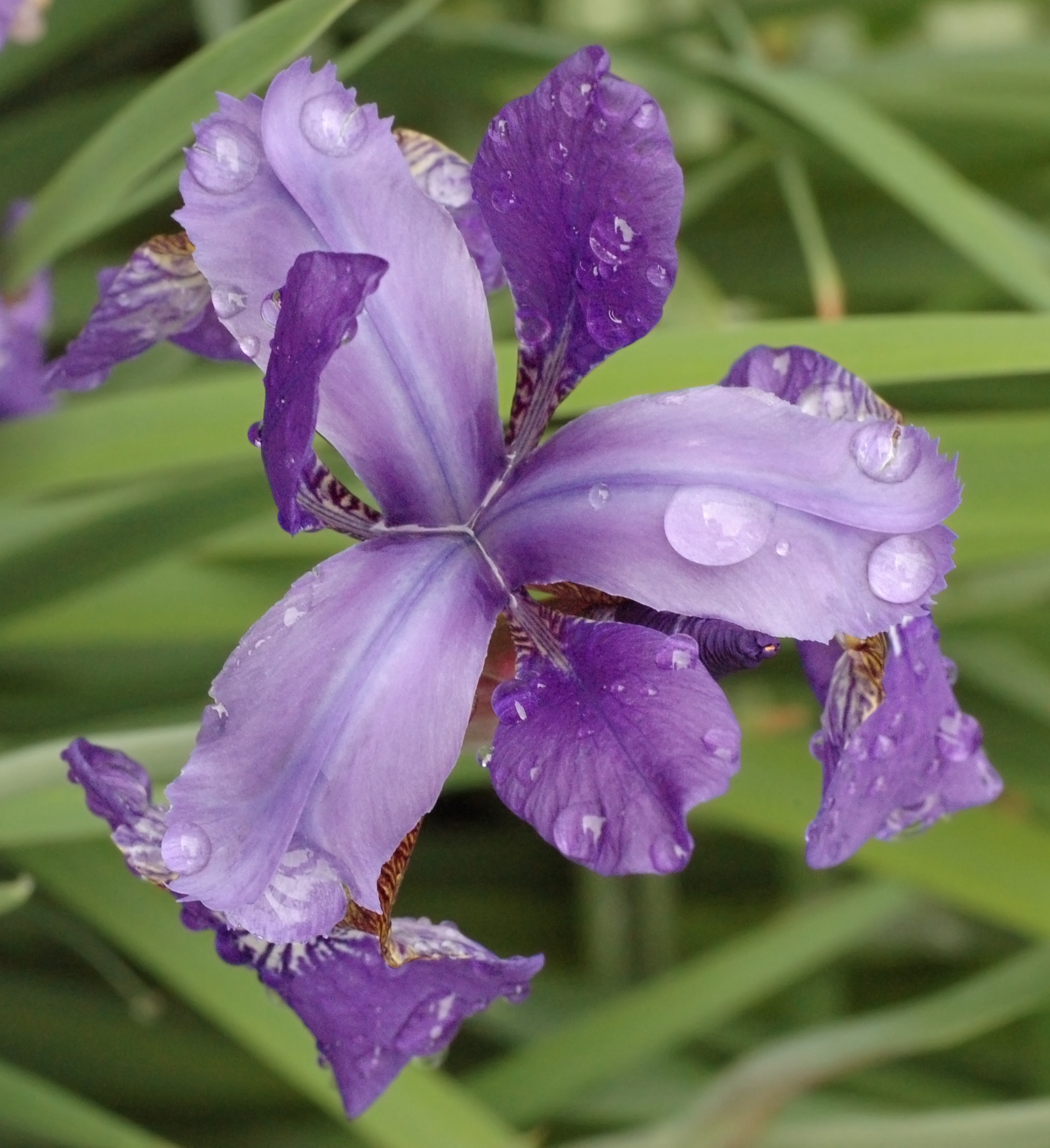
Close-up of flower with water droplets

Generally the 28 chromosome hybrids are easier to grow than the Sino-Siberians.

The iris will tolerate temperatures down to −20 °C (−4 °F). It is hardy to USDA Zone 2–8, and Zone H1 (which means hardy to −20 °C (−4 °F) and below (−40 °C (−40 °F)),), in Europe. It is hardy in the UK. If the plants are mulched in winter they can withstand colder temperatures.

The iris should be grown in well-drained, fertile, neutral to slightly acidic soils (the pH level should be more than 5.6).

If the soil has a high sand or clay content, large amounts of organic material (such as compost or well rotted manure) should be incorporated at planting time.

It prefers positions in full sun, but can tolerate part shade (with some hours of sunlight). In very hot, arid regions, they will need some shade, as well as watering and mulching.

The plant needs moisture during the growing season (in spring and early summer) to create the best blooms. Although it will tolerate occasional flooding, it does not grow in standing water.

As Vita Sackville-West noted ‘…it will do well by the waterside in a fairly damp bed, although it does not like being drowned underwater all year round.’

They can be used in various positions within gardens, at waterside locations beside pools, ponds or streams. Also known as ideal bog garden plants. They can also be used within a Herbaceous border. The iris can also be used in mixed plantings with grasses and other perennials to create naturalised gardens and meadows.

They are sturdy plants and do not need to be staked.

The National Collection (of Siberian Irises in UK) is held at Lingen Nursery, on the Welsh border.

Two more National Collections are held by Pamela Ferns in Fife, Scotland

Aphid Aphis newtoni and can be found on the plant, and Mononychus punctumalbum (Iris Weevil) also can attack the plant's seeds.

== Propagation ==
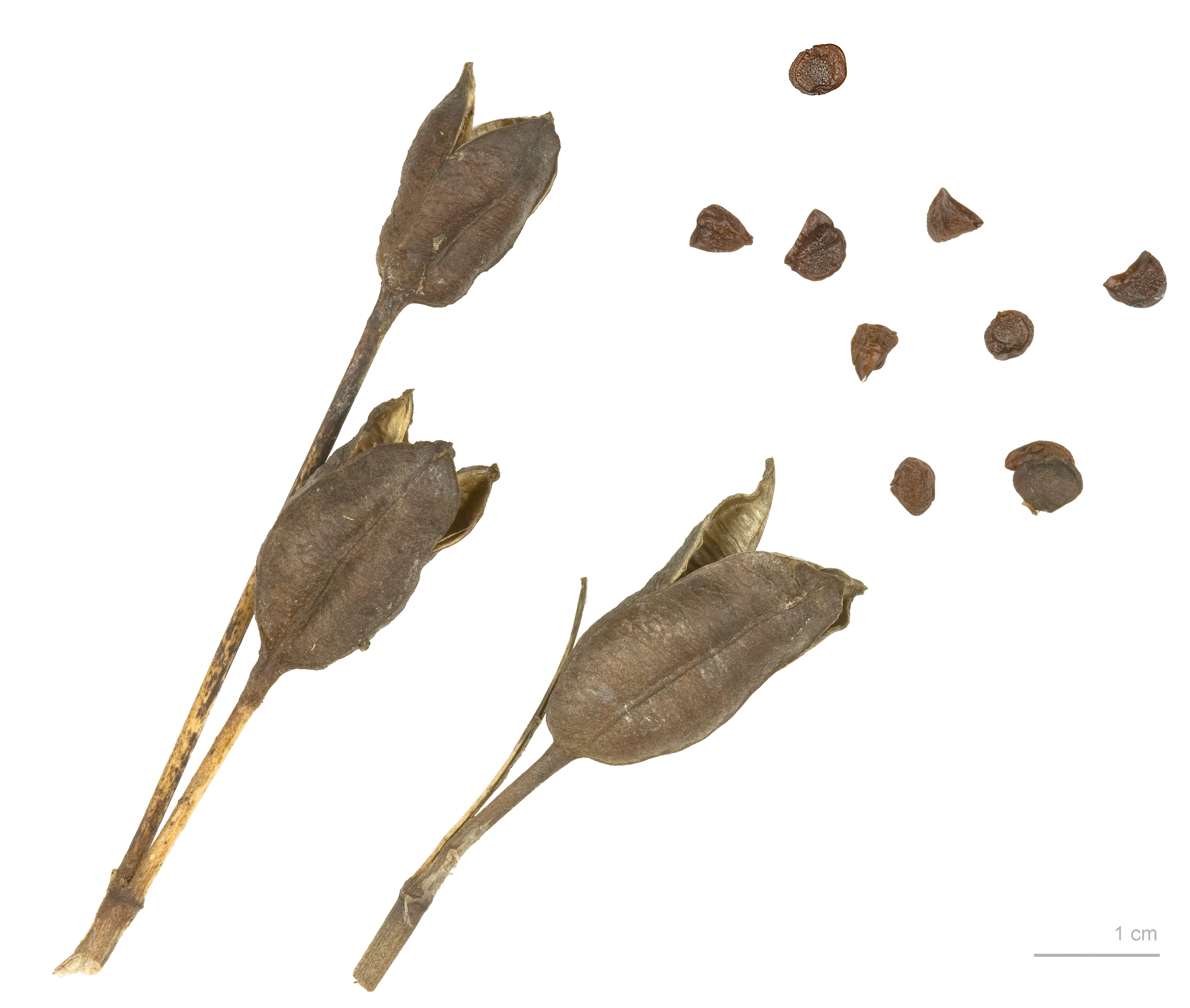
Seeds of Iris

They are best propagated by division. The best time to divide plants is mid-summer to early autumn. They do not like root disturbance and should only be divided when the center of the clump dies out. When preparing divisions for transplanting, store them in a bucket of water to stop them drying out.

The new plants are easy to grow but are slow to form flower producing plants, they can take up to 2 years to get big enough to produce flowering stems.

The iris can also be grown from seed, allow the mature pods to dry on the plant. Then break open to collect seeds and the direct sow outdoors in fall or autumn.

The new plants are planted with the top of the rhizome, 3–5 cm (1–2 in)below the soil surface. The plant position must be prepared before hand with plenty of compost (or manure) added to the soil to improve the fertility. After planting, the iris must be well watered. Seedlings are also susceptible to transplant shock, this can be lessened if a small plastic pot is placed over the newly planted plant. This protects the plant for the next 3–5 days. In some regions (especially warm areas), the transplants should be kept moist for the following 6–8 weeks.

In spring, a handful of fertilizer can be added to the plant to improve flowering or an organic mulch can be added.

It can also be propagated by somatic embryogenesis.

== Hybrids and cultivars ==
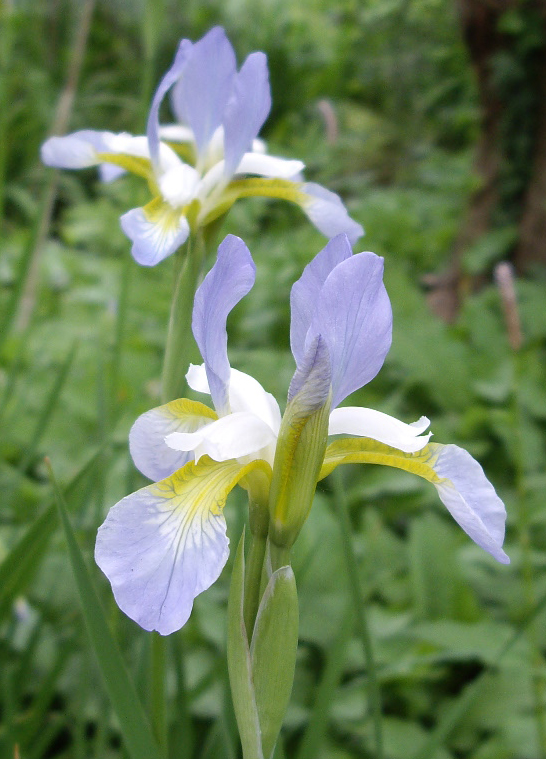
Close-up of the flower of Iris sibirica cultivar 'Summer Sky'

Since the 1970s, hybridizers and plant breeders have been cross-pollinating the various species in the Siberian group with Iris sibirica to create many hybrids. Their parentage is now so complicated that the cultivars, are no longer listed with a species name. Several hundred Siberian iris cultivars are registered with the American Iris Society. The flowers of the cultivars vary in colour from white to shades of blue or deep violet-blue. Pale blue forms were originally obtained by crossing the white and the blue varieties of Iris sibirica; it also combines readily with Iris sanguinea to produce hybrids with taller stems. The flowers of hybrids can have arched, semi-flaring, flaring or overlapped falls; some of them even have ruffled or extra falls. The newer Japanese hybrids, have six pendant falls, which make them similar in appearance to the Japanese Iris or Iris ensata.

Known cultivars include; 'Acuta'; 'Alba Grandiflora'; 'Band of Angels'; 'Butter and Sugar' (white petals on top with yellow falls); 'Caesar's Brother'; 'Caesar's Ghost'; 'Cambridge' (created in 1964); 'Coronation Anthem'; 'Dancing Nanou'; 'Dewful'; 'Dreaming Spires' (created in 1964); 'Ego' (a rich blue); 'Elmeney'; 'Enid Burgoyne'; 'Ewen'; 'Flight Of Butterflies'; 'Forward And Back'; 'Grandis'; 'Heavenly Blue'; ‘King of Kings’ (white blossoms); 'Lactea'; 'Leucantha'; 'Little Blue Sparkler'; 'Mongolius'; ‘Mysterious Monique’; 'Navy Blue'; 'Nigrescens'; 'Niklasse'; 'Papillon' (pale blue); 'Perry's Blue' (pale blue); ‘Placid Waters’ (with lavender blue flowers); 'Prairie In Bloom'; 'Pritiazheniye'; 'Royal Blue'; 'Ruffled Violet'; 'Ruffles Plus';‘Savoir Faire’ (many deep blue flowers held above the dense narrow foliage); 'Shaker's Prayer'; 'Sibirica Alba'; 'Sibirica Albescens'; 'Sibirica Angustifolia'; 'Sibirica Atropurpurea'; 'Sibirica Baxteri'; 'Sibirica Blue Bird'; 'Sibirica 'Compacta'; 'Sibirica Cristata'; 'Sibirica Flore Pleno'; 'Sibirica Gracilis'; 'Sibirica Mrs. Perry'; 'Sibirica Nana'; 'Sibirica Nana Alba'; 'Sibirica Papillon'; 'Sibirica Snowdrift'; 'Silver Edge'; 'Sky Wings'; 'Snow Prince'; 'Snow Queen'; ‘Southcombe White’; ‘Sultan’s Ruby’ (deep magenta blooms); 'Summer Sky'; ‘Super Ego’; 'Swank'; 'U.S.O.'; ‘Violet Flare’; ‘Wing on Wing’ (white); and 'Wisley White'.

Known Iris sibirica crosses; 'Abitibi'; 'Aindling Goldauge'; 'Aindling Libelle'; 'Aindling Morgenstimmung'; 'Aindling Rohrsaenger'; 'Banish Misfortune'; 'Butterfly Fountain'; 'Chaudiere'; 'Chrysobirica'; 'Chrysobirica Gloriosa'; 'Chrysobirica Purpurea'; 'Common Denominator'; 'Cookley Blue'; 'Foretell'; 'Gatineau'; 'Helicon'; 'Hohe Warte'; 'Kootenay'; 'Lichterfeldius'; 'Madawaska'; 'Matane'; 'Mauve Snowtop'; 'Moonscape'; 'Neidenstein'; 'Ottawa'; 'Rideau'; 'Rimouski'; 'Royal Californian'; 'Pausback Sibtosa'; 'Pembina'; 'Pennywhistle'; 'Pickanock'; 'Salamander Crossing'; 'Sarah Tiffney'; 'Sibulleyanna'; 'Soothsayer'; 'Sporting Chance'; 'Starsteps'; 'Stilles Wasser'; 'True Blue'; 'Vidtinky Nochi'; 'Violet Wave'; 'Weber's Spring Blues' and 'Zeta'.

=== AGM cultivars ===
The following cultivars have gained the Royal Horticultural Society's Award of Garden Merit (in the UK):-

- 'Butter and Sugar'
- 'Cambridge'
- 'Ruffled Velvet'
- 'Silver Edge'

== Toxicity ==
Like many other irises, most parts of the plant are poisonous (rhizome and leaves), if mistakenly ingested can cause stomach pains and vomiting. Also handling the plant may cause a skin irritation or an allergic reaction. However an edible starch has been extracted from the plant in China, similar to Iris ensata. The root has also been used to create an insecticide and an expectorant.

== Uses ==
Johan Peter Falk noted that the Tara Tartars of Russia (West Siberia) coloured cloth yellow with Iris sibirica flowers and the Votyaks, Mordvins and Kalmyks derived red dye from Galium species.

It has also been used to create a drug to be used as an emetic and laxative.

An old traditional usage before the wedding night, Polish girls eat the cooked fruit (seeds) of Iris sibirica to help improve contraception.

== Culture ==
An illustration of Iris sibirica has been used as a Postage stamp in Poland.

== Gallery ==
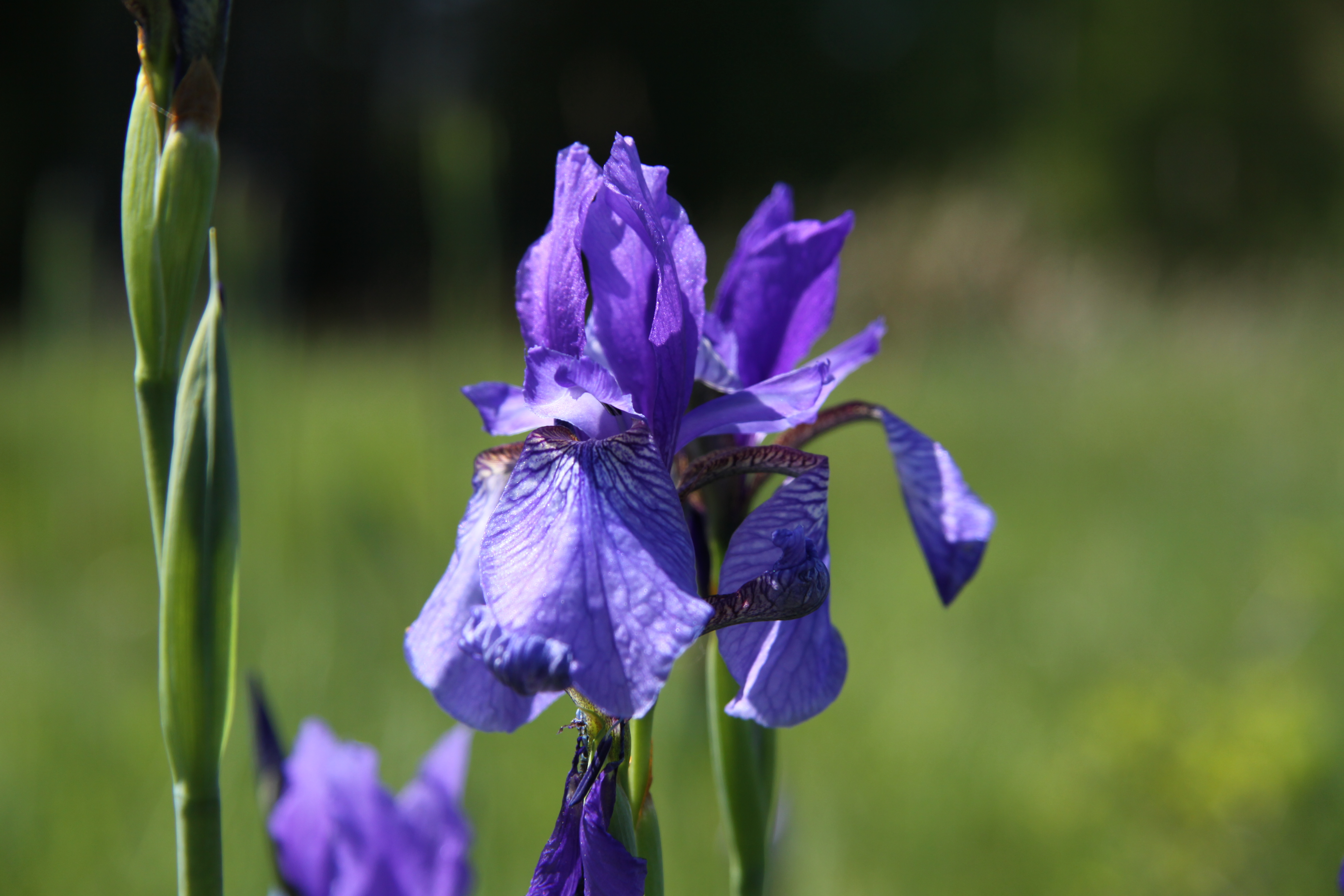

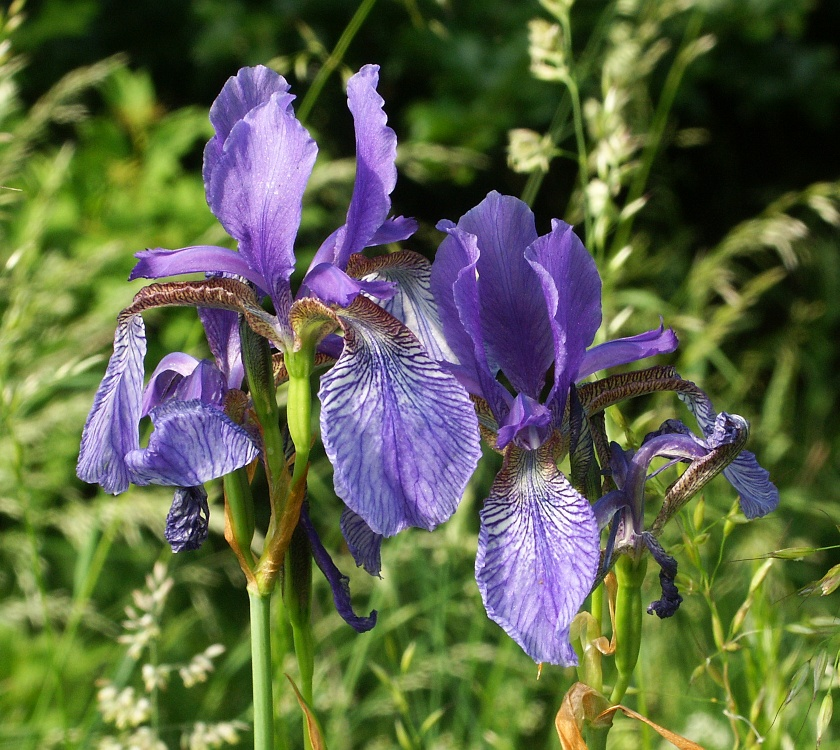

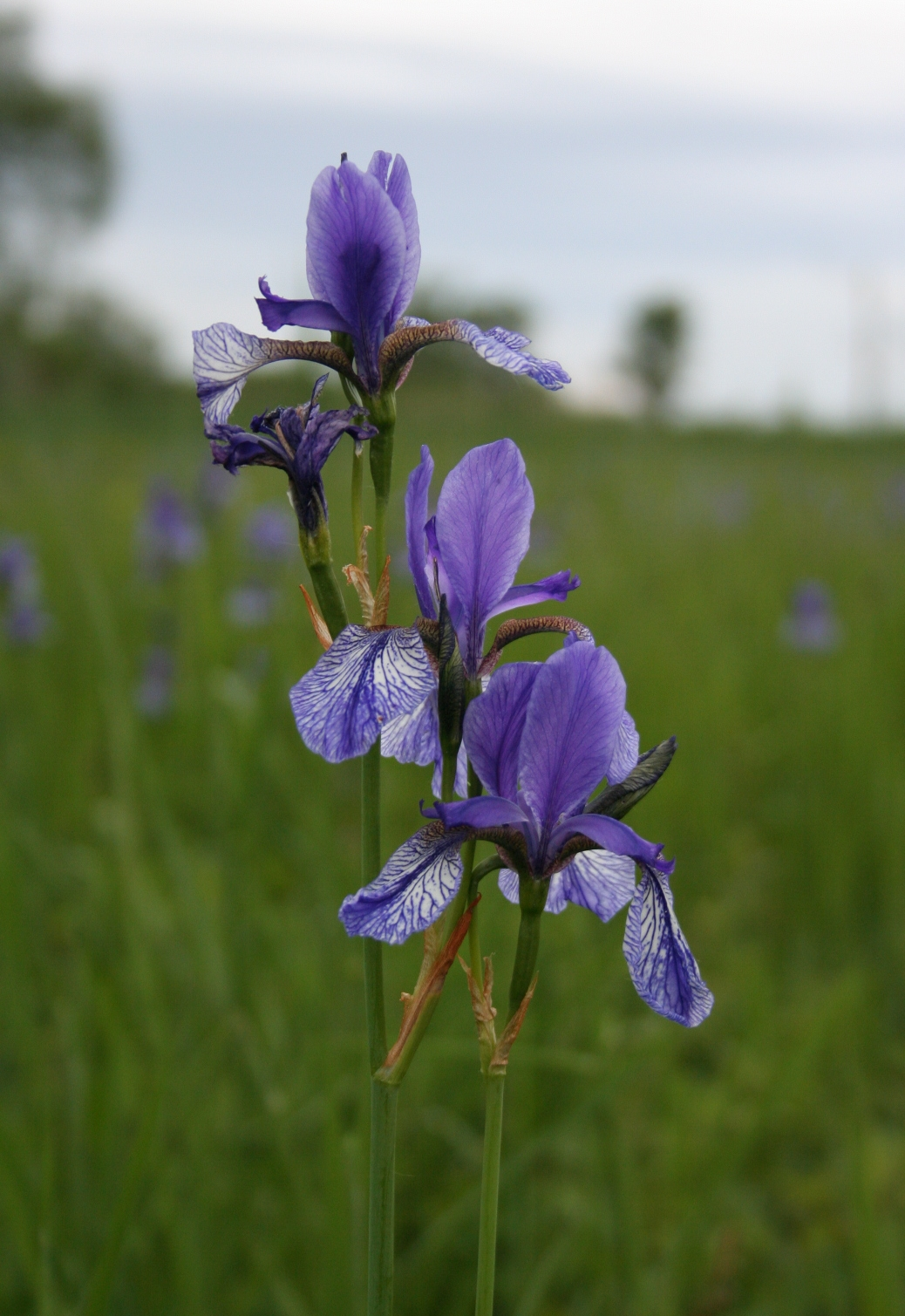

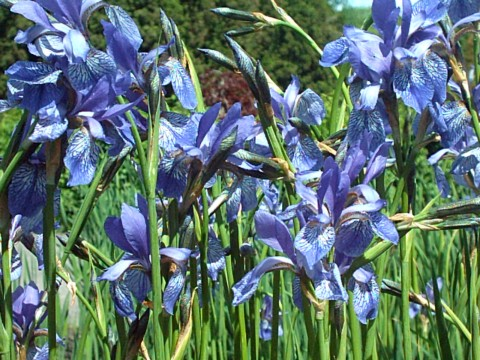

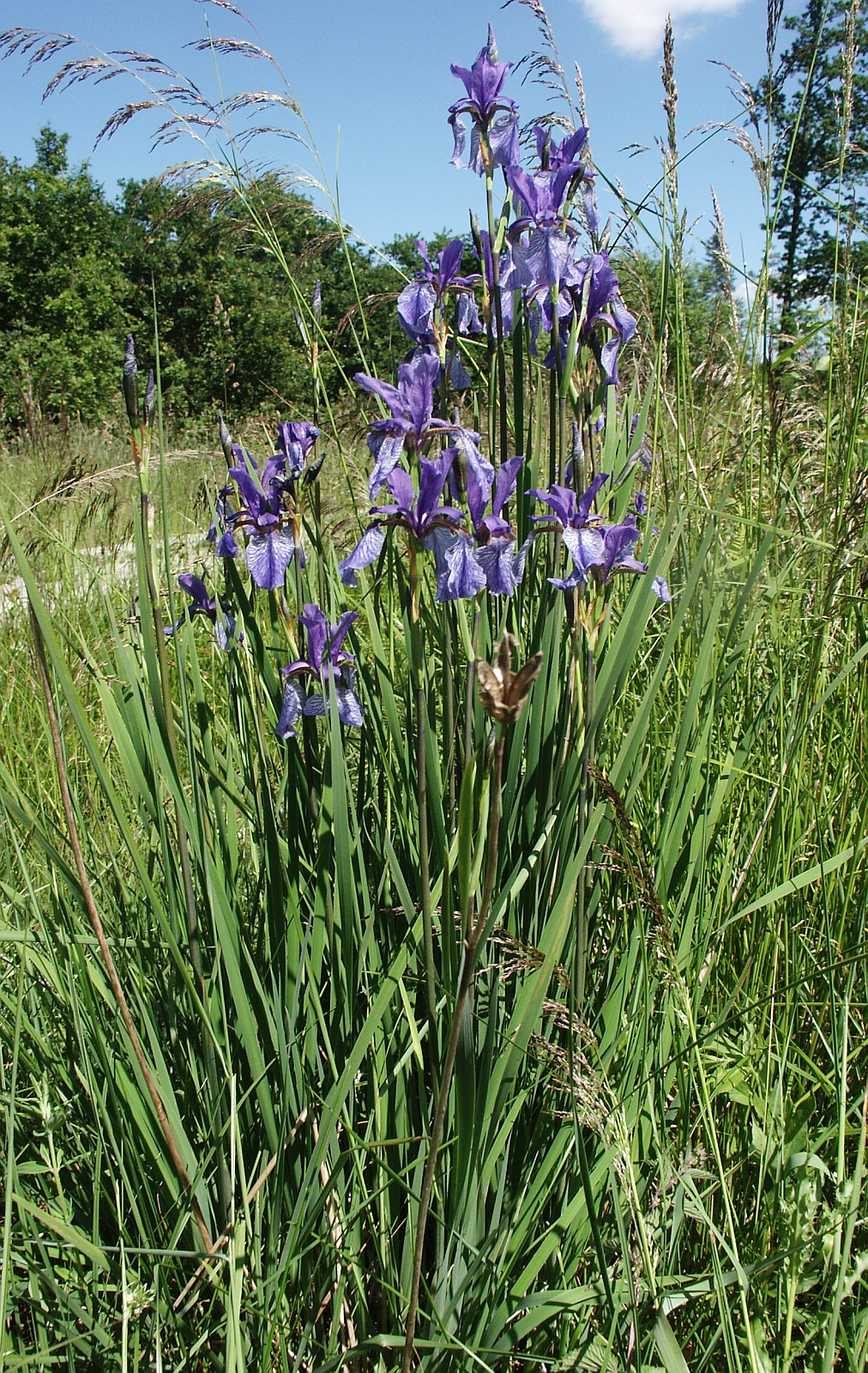

Iris sibirica Cultivars

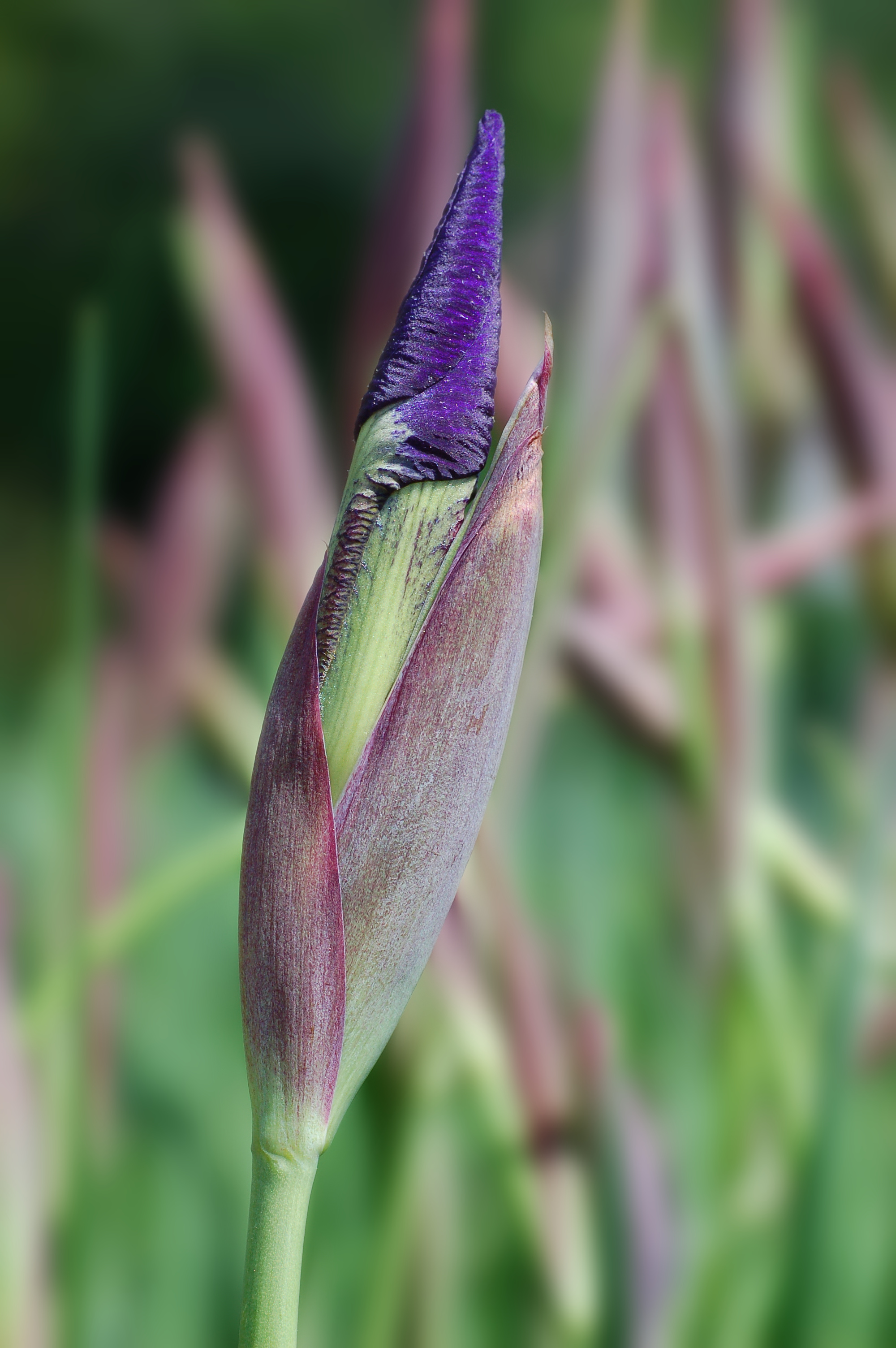
An unopened flower

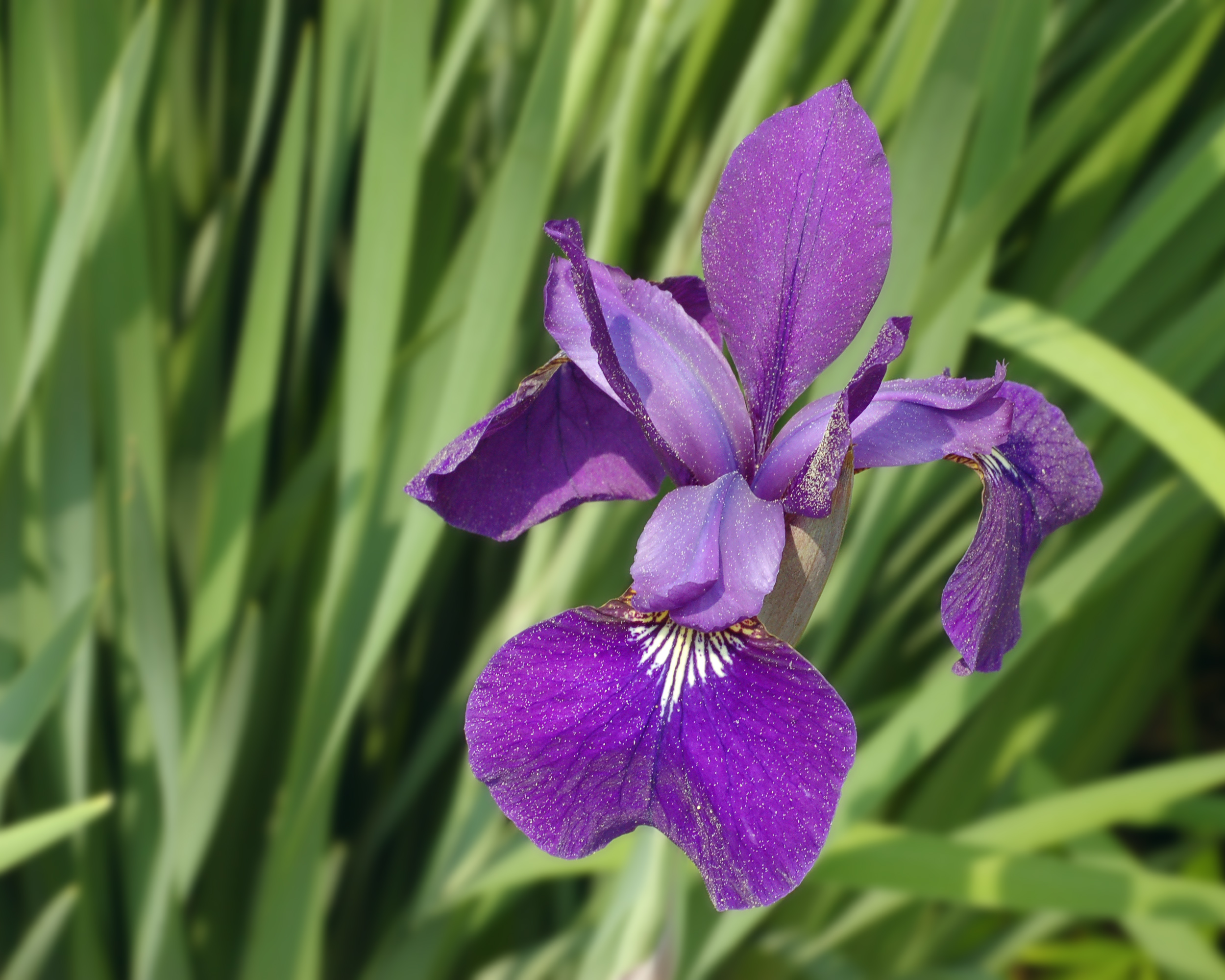
Flower

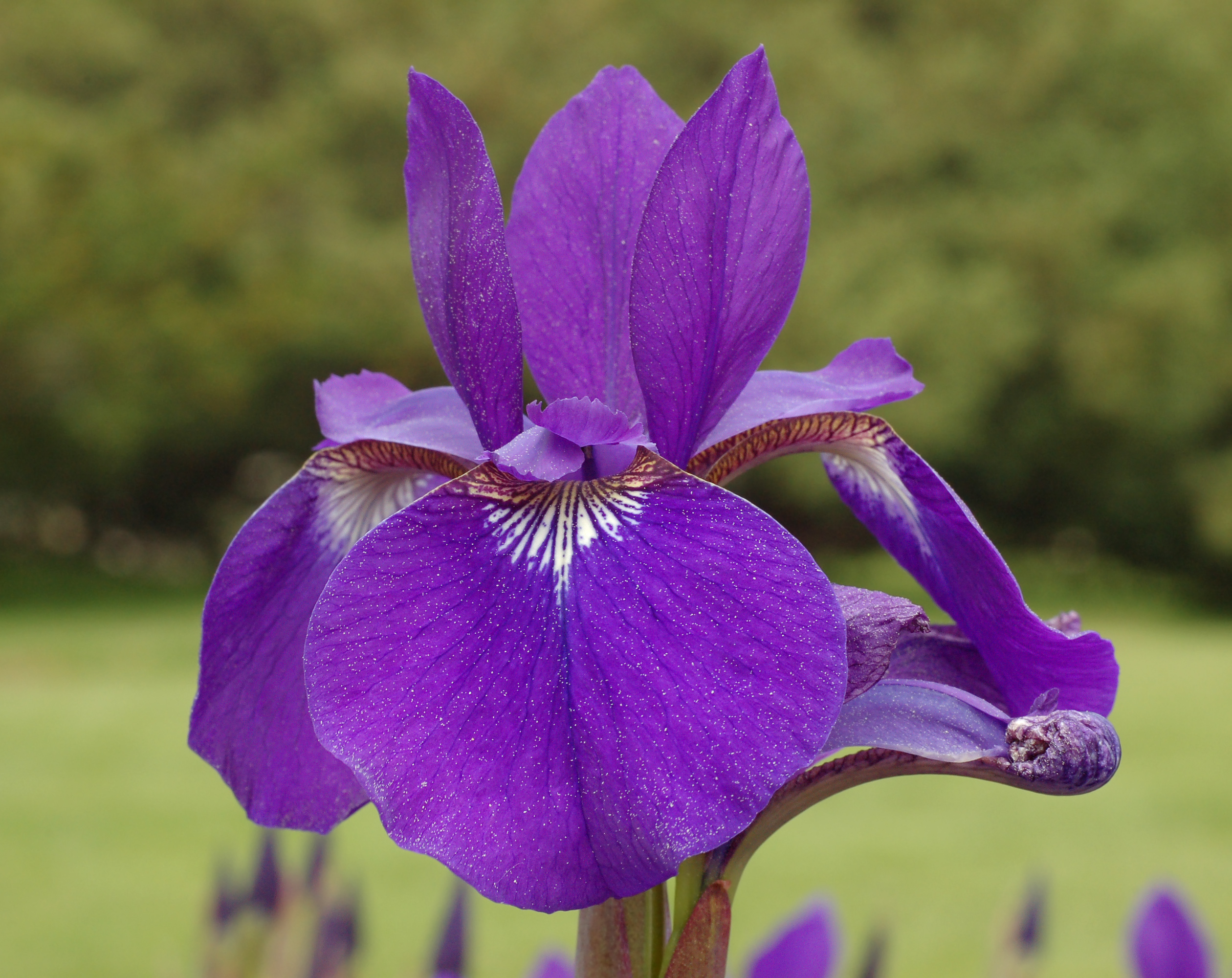
Flower closeup

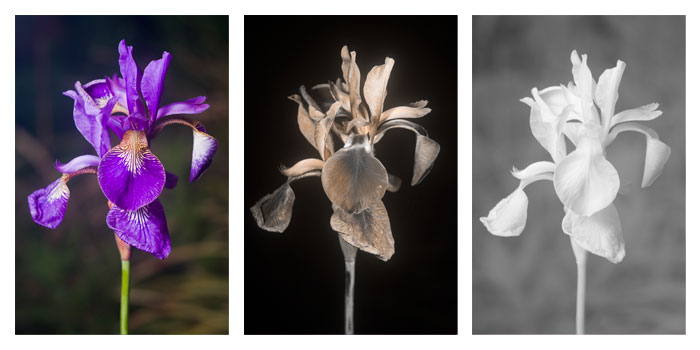
Flower in visible light, UV (showing nectar guides), and IR

== Sources ==
- Aldén, B., S. Ryman & M. Hjertson. 2009. Våra kulturväxters namn – ursprung och användning. Formas, Stockholm (Handbook on Swedish cultivated and utility plants, their names and origin).
- Chinese Academy of Sciences. 1959–. Flora reipublicae popularis sinicae.
- Czerepanov, S. K. 1995. Vascular plants of Russia and adjacent states (the former USSR).
- Davis, P. H., ed. 1965–1988. Flora of Turkey and the east Aegean islands.
- Erhardt, W. et al. 2008. Der große Zander: Enzyklopädie der Pflanzennamen.
- FNA Editorial Committee. 1993–. Flora of North America.
- Huxley, A., ed. 1992. The new Royal Horticultural Society dictionary of gardening.
- Komarov, V. L. et al., eds. 1934–1964. Flora of the U.S.S.R..
- Mathew, B. 1981. The Iris. 91–92.
- Stace, Clive 1995. New Flora of the British Isles.
- Tutin, T. G. et al., eds. 1964–1980. Flora europaea.
- Walters, S. M. et al., eds. 1986–. European garden flora.
- Zhong Guo & Hua Jing. 1993. China floral encyclopaedia.
