= Japanese iris =

Group of iris cultivars

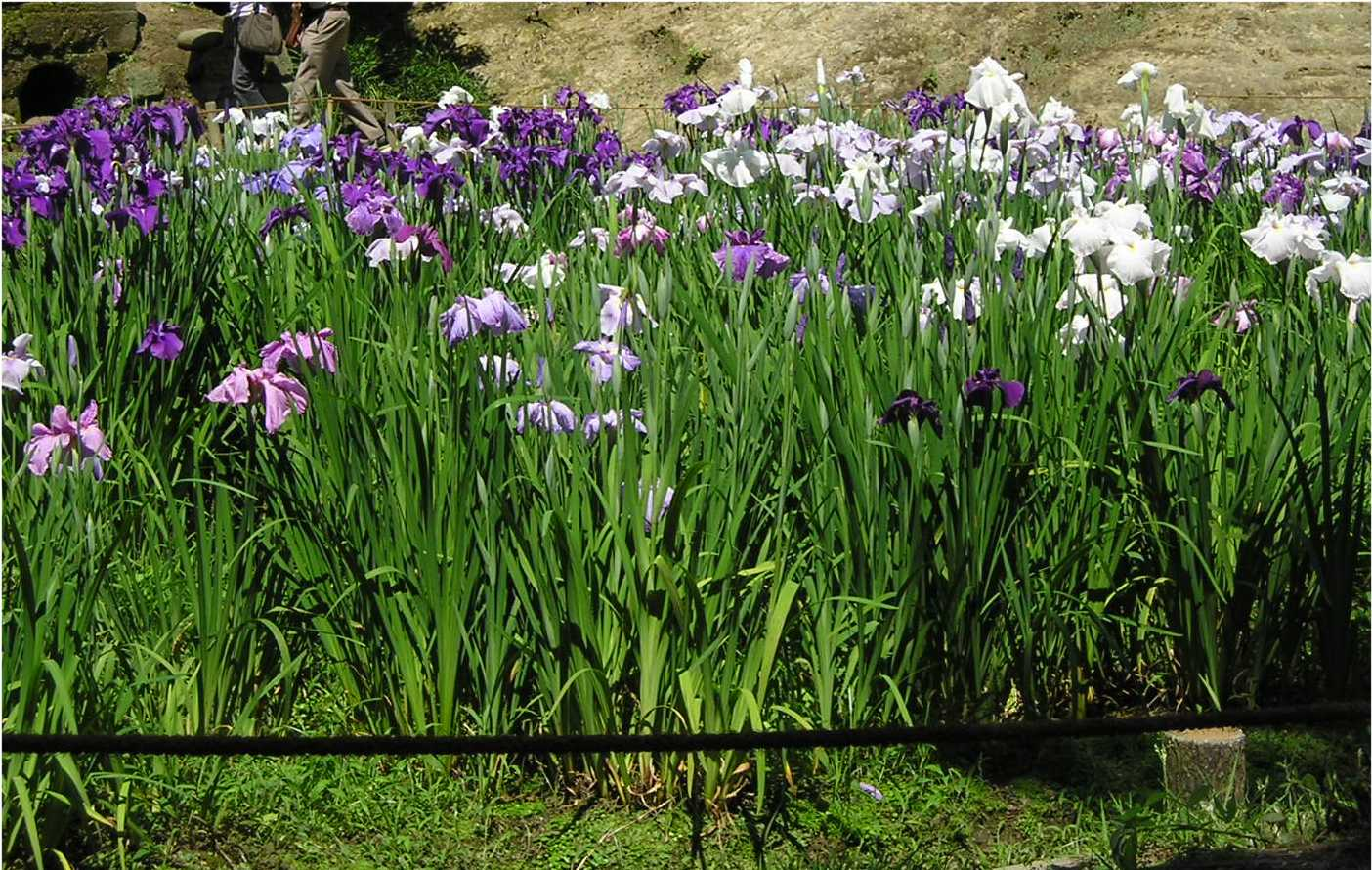
Hanashōbu at Meigetsu-in

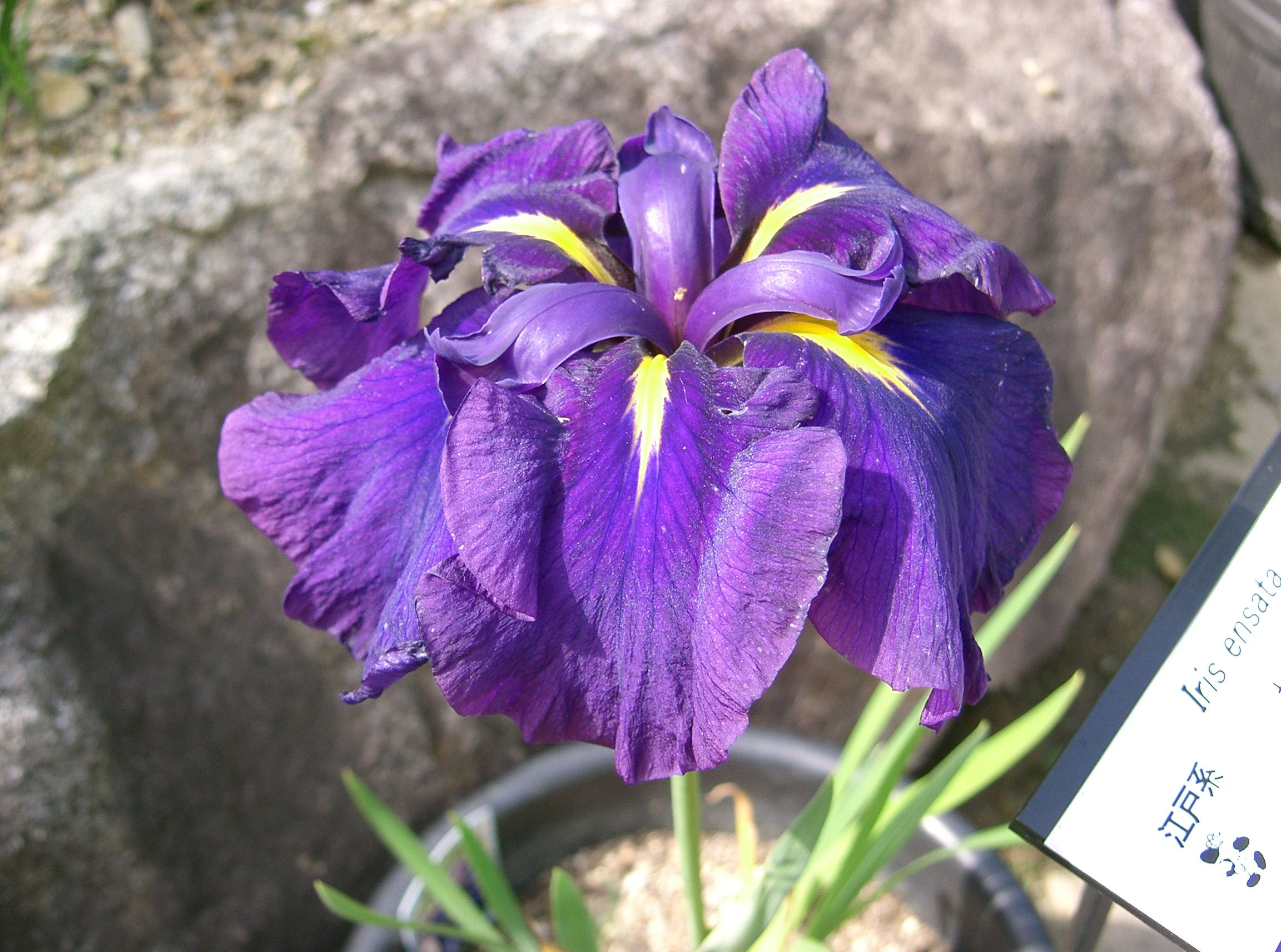
Iris ensata (including Iris kaempferi)

The term "Japanese iris" encompasses three species of Irises cultivated in gardens or growing wild in Japan: hanashōbu (Iris ensata), kakitsubata (Iris laevigata) and ayame (Iris sanguinea). Of these three species, I. ensata is the one most commonly referred to as "Japanese iris" outside Japan.

The bluish purple color of the flowers of the Japanese garden iris is an example of the copigmentation phenomenon.

== Hanashōbu ==
The hanashōbu (ハナショウブ, 花菖蒲, Iris ensata var. ensata, syn. I. ensata var. hortensis I. kaempferi) grows in the wet land and is the most extensively cultivated variety in Japanese gardens. According to the place where it was cultivated, it is classified into the Edo (Tokyo), Higo (Kumamoto Prefecture), Ise (Mie Prefecture), American (U.S.) and other series. It is extensively grown in gardens throughout the temperate zones. Several cultivars have been selected, of which 'Rose Queen' and 'Variegata' have gained the Royal Horticultural Society's Award of Garden Merit.

== Kakitsubata ==
The kakitsubata (カキツバタ, 杜若, Iris laevigata) grows in the semi-wet land and is less popular, but is also cultivated extensively.

It is a prefectural flower of Aichi Prefecture due to the famous tanka poem which is said to have been written in this area during the Heian period, as it appears in The Tales of Ise by Ariwara no Narihira (note that the beginning syllables are "ka-ki-tsu-ha (ba)-ta"):

Original text	Pronunciation	Meaning
から衣 きつゝなれにし つましあれば はるばるきぬる たびをしぞ思	Karakoromo Kitsutsu narenishi Tsuma shi areba, Harubaru kinuru Tabi o shizo omou	I have come so far away on this trip this time and think of my wife that I left in Kyoto

Kakitsubata at Ōta Shrine, Kyoto, is a National Natural Treasure. It was already recorded in a tanka by Fujiwara Toshinari also in the Heian period:

Original text	Pronunciation	Meaning
神山や大田の沢のかきつばた ふかきたのみは色に見ゆらむ	Kamiyama ya ōta no sawa no kakitsubata Fukaki tanomi wa iro ni miyu ramu	Like the kakitsubata at Ōta Wetland, a God-sent heaven, my trust in you can be seen in the color of their flowers.

== Ayame ==
The ayame (アヤメ, 菖蒲, 文目, Iris sanguinea) is the iris typically growing wild on the dry land in Japan.

== Characteristics ==
Classification	Color of flower	Leaf	Feature of flower	Location	Flowering time
Hanashōbu	Red purple, purple, etc.	Distinct artery	Shows no net	Wet land	Early June - late June
Kakitsubata	Blue, purple, white, etc.	Small artery	Shows no net	In water or wet land	mid-May - late May
Ayame	Purple, rarely white	Main artery not clear	Shows net	Dry land	Early May - Mid-June

Note: Sweet flag, called shōbu (ショウブ, 菖蒲) in Japanese, is a plant belonging to the family Acoraceae, genus Acorus, known for its fragrant roots, rather than its flowers.

== See also ==
- Iris (plant)
