= Hwaseong Heroes Baseball Park =

Stadium in Hwaseong, South Korea

Coordinates: 37.26280°N 126.84554°E

- Interactive map of Hwaseong Heroes Baseball Park
- Location: Bibong-myeon, Hwaseong, Gyeonggi-do, South Korea
- Owner: City of Hwaseong
- Operator: Kiwoom Heroes
- Capacity: 300
- Surface: Artificial turf
- Field size: Left Field – 96 metres (315 ft); Center – 120 metres (394 ft)

Construction
- Opened: 4 April 2014

Tenant
- Kiwoom Heroes (KBO)

Hwaseong Heroes Baseball Park is a baseball stadium in Hwaseong, South Korea. The stadium is used by the Hwaseong Heroes of the KBO Futures League.
