= Iris cathayensis =

Scientific classification
- Kingdom: Plantae
- Clade: Tracheophytes
- Clade: Angiosperms
- Clade: Monocots
- Order: Asparagales
- Family: Iridaceae
- Genus: Iris
- Subgenus: Iris subg. Limniris
- Section: Iris sect. Limniris
- Series: Iris ser. Tenuifoliae
- Species: I. cathayensis

Binomial name
- Iris cathayensis Migo

Synonyms
- None known

Species of flowering plant

Iris cathayensis is a beardless iris in the genus Iris, in the subgenus Limniris and in the series Tenuifoliae of the genus. It is a rhizomatous herbaceous perennial from China. It has grey-green leaves, short stems and violet flowers.

== Description ==
Iris cathayensis has a brown, tough, knobbly rhizome that has dark red leaf bases (from last season's leaves).

It has linear, greyish-green, 15–25 cm (6–10 in) long and 3–4 mm wide at blooming time. It later extends up to 45 cm (18 in) long and 6 mm wide. The tips of the leaves arch over.

It has very short flowering stems, 15–25 cm (6–10 in) long. Sometimes, the stems do not emerge from below ground.

It has between 3–4 green, lanceolate, between 12–8 cm (5–3 in) long and 2–1.2 cm (1–0 in) wide, large spathes (leaves of the flower bud). It has membranous margins, visible mid-vein and pointed end.

The flowers are 6–7.5 cm (2–3 in) in diameter, and come in shades of violet, in April.

It has 2 pairs of petals, 3 large sepals (outer petals), known as the 'falls' and 3 inner, smaller petals (or tepals, known as the 'standards'. The falls are narrowly oblanceolate, 4–5.5 cm (2–2 in) long and 5 mm wide. The standards are also narrowly oblanceolate, 4–5 cm (2–2 in) long and 5 mm wide.

It has a 1.5–2 cm long, filiform (thread-like) pedicel, 7–9 cm long perianth tube, 2.8–3.5 cm long stamens, blue anthers and 1.3–1.5 long ovary. It also has 3.5–4 cm (1–2 in) long and 3 mm wide, linear style branches, the same colour as the petals.

After the iris has flowered, it produces a seed capsule (not described) between June and August.

=== Biochemistry ===
In 2000, a chemical analysis of 22 species of iris from China was carried out. According to the distribution pattern of isoflavones in the species, they can be separated into 2 groups. One group contains isoflavonoid aglycons and the other has glycosides and isoflavonoid aglycons. Iris cathayensis Migo and Iris mandshurica Pall. are considered intermediate groups between subgen. Limniris and Iris subg. Iris.

In 2005, a study was carried out to find out the chemical composition of Iris cathayensis. Using chromatography and spectroscopic methods, as well as others.

== Taxonomy ==
It is written as 华夏鸢尾 in Chinese script and known as hua xia yuan wei in China.

It has the common name of 'China iris', or Cathay iris.

The Latin specific epithet cathayensis refers to Cathay, the anglicized version of "Catai" and an alternative name for China.

It was published and described by Hisao Migo in the Journal of the Shanghai Science Institute Sect. 3 Vol. 4 on page 140 in 1939.

It was later published in Flora of Jiangsu, First Vol. 395, Fig. 712 in 1977.

== Distribution and habitat ==
Iris cathayensis is native to temperate areas of Asia.

=== Range ===
It is found in the Chinese provinces of Anhui, Jiangsu, Hubei, and Zhejiang.

=== Habitat ===
It is found growing on open hillsides and grasslands, and low-altitude mountain meadow slopes.

== Cultivation ==
Iris cathayensis is not common in cultivation in the UK.

It prefers to grow in sandy soils. It needs to be kept dry during winter, needing the protection of bulb frames, it only needs water during the growing season.
