= Iris ventricosa =

Scientific classification
- Kingdom: Plantae
- Clade: Embryophytes
- Clade: Tracheophytes
- Clade: Spermatophytes
- Clade: Angiosperms
- Clade: Monocots
- Order: Asparagales
- Family: Iridaceae
- Genus: Iris
- Subgenus: Iris subg. Limniris
- Section: Iris sect. Limniris
- Series: Iris ser. Tenuifoliae
- Species: I. ventricosa

Binomial name
- Iris ventricosa Pall.

Synonyms
- Sclerosiphon ventricosum (Pall.) Rodion.; Xyridion ventricosum (Pall.) Klatt

Species of flowering plant

Iris ventricosa is a beardless iris in the genus Iris, in the subgenus Limniris and in the series Tenuifoliae of the genus. It is a rhizomatous herbaceous perennial, from Asia and the Russian Federation, to Mongolia and China. It has grey-green leaves, short flowers stems and 1–2 pale violet or pale blue flowers.

== Description ==
Iris ventricosa is similar in form to Iris bungei, with a few differences.

It has knobbly, woody, tough, short and thick rhizomes. Under the rhizomes, are thread-like black roots, which can go down into the soil over 45 cm (18 in) deep. On top of the rhizome, is a dense, network-like arrangement of brown fibres, which are the remains of the last seasons leaves, they surround the new leaves and flower stems like a sheath.

It is often grows as single specimens, but can sometimes form thick colonies of plants.

It has linear, grey-green leaves, which are 20–50 cm (8–20 in) long and 3–4 mm wide.

It has flower stems, that are 10–20 cm (4–8 in) long.

The stems hold 1–2, terminal (top of stem) flowers, blooming in May, or June.

It has three yellowish green, acuminate (pointed), between 6–8 cm (2–3 in) long and 2.5–4 cm wide, spathes (leaves of the flower bud). They have netted veining and are inflated. Hence the common names.

It has flowers are 6–7 cm (2–3 in) in diameter, that come in shades of pale violet, or pale blue. It has 2 pairs of petals, 3 large sepals (outer petals), known as the 'falls' and 3 inner, smaller petals (or tepals, known as the 'standards'. The falls are slender, narrowly spatulate (spoon shaped), 3.5–5 cm (1–2 in) long and 8–10 mm wide. They have a band of papillose (or small hairs), along the mid-vein. The narrower, lanceolate, semi-erect standards are 3.5–4 cm (1–2 in) long and 7–8 mm wide.

It has 2.5–4 cm long perianth tube, 1-1.5 cm long pedicel and 3–3.8 cm (1–1 in) long and 6 mm wide style branches. Which are similar in colour to the standards with a defined mid-vein.

It has 3–3.5 cm long stamens, yellowish-purple anthers and 1.5 cm long and 2.5–3 mm long ovary.

After the iris has flowered, between July and August (in China), or between late August and early September (in Russia). it produces an ellipsoid or cylindrical seed capsule, measuring 2.5–4 cm long and 1 cm wide. It has six veins, three thickened angles and apical beak.

=== Biochemistry ===
As most irises are diploid, having two sets of chromosomes, this can be used to identify hybrids and classification of groupings. Specimens from Primorskii Krai in Russia, were found to have a chromosome count of 2n=28.

== Taxonomy ==
It is written as 囊花鸢尾 in Chinese script and known as nang hua yuan wei in Pinyin Chinese.

It is known as Tsürdger iris in Mongolia.

It has many common names, including Swollen Iris, or purple-flower iris (in China), or Bellied Iris (in the 1800s in the UK), or balloon flower iris,

The Latin specific epithet ventricosa refers to the inflated bract (or swelling) below the flower.

It was published and described by Peter Simon Pallas in Reise Russ. Reich. Vol.3 page712 in 1776. It was originally described from specimens found in the mountain zone of Dauria, between the valleys of Urulunguya and Argun rivers. The river Argun runs between Siberia and Manchuria.

It was verified by United States Department of Agriculture Agricultural Research Service on 4 April 2003.

Iris ventricosa is an accepted name by the RHS.

== Distribution and habitat ==
Iris ventricosa is native to various temperate areas of eastern Asia.

=== Range ===
It is found in the Russian Federation, within the Siberian regions of Agin-Buryat Okrug, Buryatia and Chita, and Primorye. Within the Asian countries of Mongolia, and China. In the Chinese provinces of Hebei, Heilongjiang, Jilin, Liaoning, Nei Mongol Xinjiang, and Qinghai.

=== Habitat ===
It is found growing on dry, rocky slopes, on gravelly slopes, on sandy grasslands and dunes.

== Conservation ==
It has suffered from habitat loss, due to direct and indirect effects from environmental damage. Especially near settlements.

== Uses ==
In Mongolia, 14 species of iris are found. They have been used in traditional herbal medicines to treat Cancer, inflammations and bacterial infections. In September 2008, the rhizomes of Iris ventricosa were collected for a study of its biologically active substances. Various flavones and isoflavones, some peltogynoids (irisoid a, b, c, d and e), saponins, coumarins and benzoquinones were found.

In 2013, a study was carried out on the various species of iris growing in east Transbaikalia region of Russia. Five species were found: Iris ivanovae, Iris laevigata, Iris sanguinea, Iris tenuifolia and Iris ventricosa. All are listed as 'endangered' in the Red Book of Chita Oblast and Agin-Buryat Autonomous Okrug of 2002. The species were all found in steppe habitats, and are more resistant to drought and low winter temperatures.

== Cultivation ==
Iris ventricosa is not common in cultivation in the UK. It is not common also in Russia. It is also rare in the US.

It prefers alkaline, sandy and well drained soils.

It also prefers positions in full sun.

It needs to be kept dry during winter, needing the protection of a bulb frame. It only needs water during the growing season.

It does not like being disturbed or being transplanted. It can be re-produced by seed.

It may be suitable to be cultivated in a dry rock garden. It can be grown in very deep pots, as long as the watering is controlled.

It has been cultivated in Moscow, Chita and Vladivostok, since 1786. It was also grown in the Moscow's Botanical Gardens (the Neskuchny Gardens). It was tried by various gardeners and horticulturists in Moscow and Chita, but all attempts failed. It only survived and grows in Vladivostok, Moscow (MGU Botanic Garden) and the Botanical Garden of Chita.

A specimen exists in the Linnean Society of London Herbarium, which was collected by P.S. Pallas.

== Hybrids and cultivars ==
It has not been used in any iris breeding trials.
