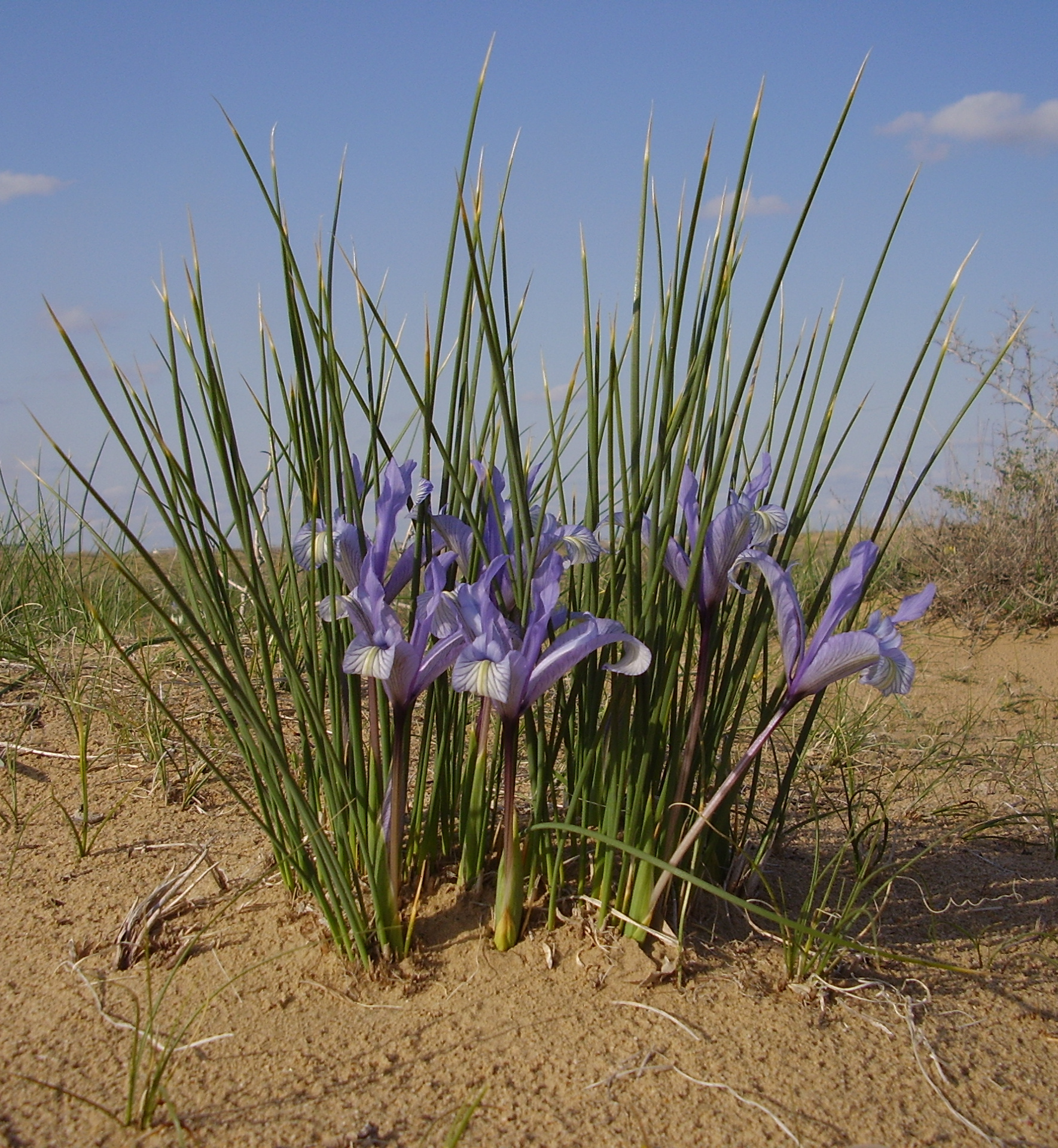
- Iris tenuifolia

Scientific classification
- Kingdom: Plantae
- Clade: Embryophytes
- Clade: Tracheophytes
- Clade: Angiosperms
- Clade: Monocots
- Order: Asparagales
- Family: Iridaceae
- Genus: Iris
- Subgenus: Iris subg. Limniris
- Section: Iris sect. Limniris
- Series: Iris ser. Tenuifoliae

= Iris ser. Tenuifoliae =

Group of flowering plants

Iris ser. Tenuifoliae is a series of the genus Iris, in Iris. subg. Limniris.

The series was first classified by Ludwig Diels in 'Die Natürlichen Pflanzenfamilien' (Edited by H. G. A. Engler and K. Prantl) in 1930. It was further expanded by George Hill Mathewson Lawrence in Gentes Herb (written in Dutch) in 1953.

Most of the species in this series come from Central Asia, and are found in semi-desert conditions, Such as dry steppes and grasslands.

They are rare in cultivation in the UK. Most are only grown for scientific interest by botanists. They prefer a northern continental climate in a dry prairie similar to Nebraska or North or South Dakota in the US.

They have very delicate rhizomes and do not like being disturbed. In the UK, they need to be grown in Bulb frames, with water during the summer but dry during the winter.

Includes;

- Iris anguifuga Y.T.Zhao & X.J.Xue
- Iris bungei Maxim.
- Iris cathayensis Migo
- Iris farreri Dykes (sometimes known as Iris polysticta)
- Iris kobayashii Kitag.
- Iris loczyi Kanitz
- Iris qinghainica Y.T.Zhao
- Iris songarica Schrenk
- Iris tenuifolia Pall.
- Iris ventricosa Pall.
