= Hotbed =

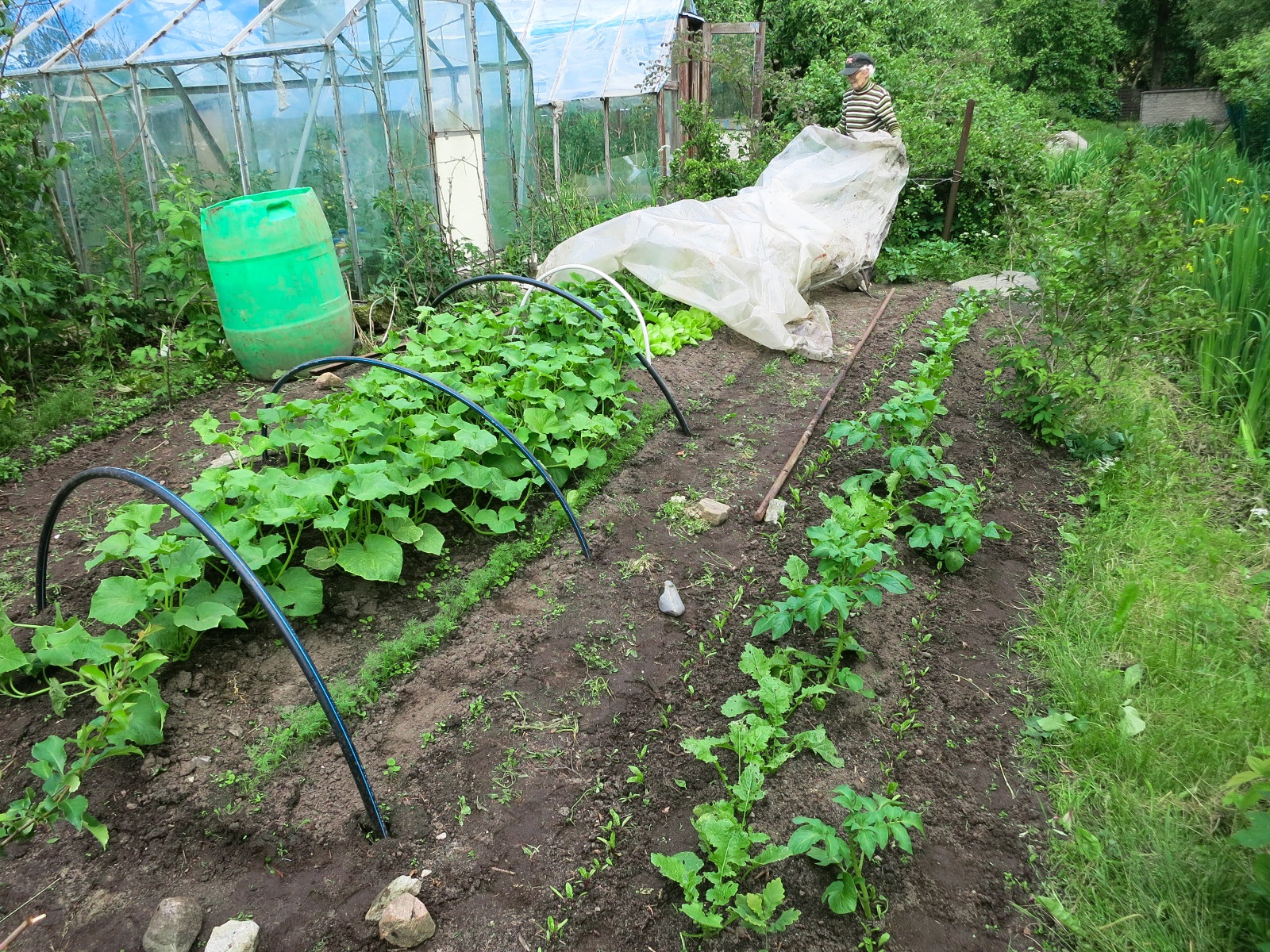
A cucumber hotbed in Estonia

A hotbed is a biological term for an area of decaying organic matter that is warmer than its surroundings. The heat gradient is generated by the decomposition of organic substituent within the pile by microorganism metabolization.

A hotbed covered with a small glass cover (also called a hotbox) is used as a small version of a hothouse (heated greenhouse or cold frame). Oftentimes, this bed is made of manure from animals such as horses, which pass undigested plant cellulose in their droppings, creating a good environment for microorganisms to come and break down the cellulose, providing heat and fertilizer in order to speed up the process of raising seedlings. (The digestive systems of ruminants such as cattle and sheep destroy and use all cellulose in their food, and their droppings remain cold and do not heat up.)

Hotbeds employed in gardens are generally simple in application. Experimental research from Neugebauer (2018) concluded that other forms of organic waste, such as compost, can be used in place of manure in hotbeds, providing not only means of promoting plant growth, but also an ecologically friendly way to dispose of waste. Data from this study does suggest that the amount of heat released by hotbeds does decrease after some time, however. Additionally, although not experimentally supported, the article from Neugebauer (2018) provides an idea that perhaps the carbon dioxide released from the hotbed is taken up by the plants, further improving the rate at which the plants grow.

Some egg-laying animals, such as the brush turkey, make or use hotbeds to incubate their eggs.

By extension, the term hotbed is used metaphorically to describe an environment that is ideal for the growth or development of something, especially of something undesirable.
