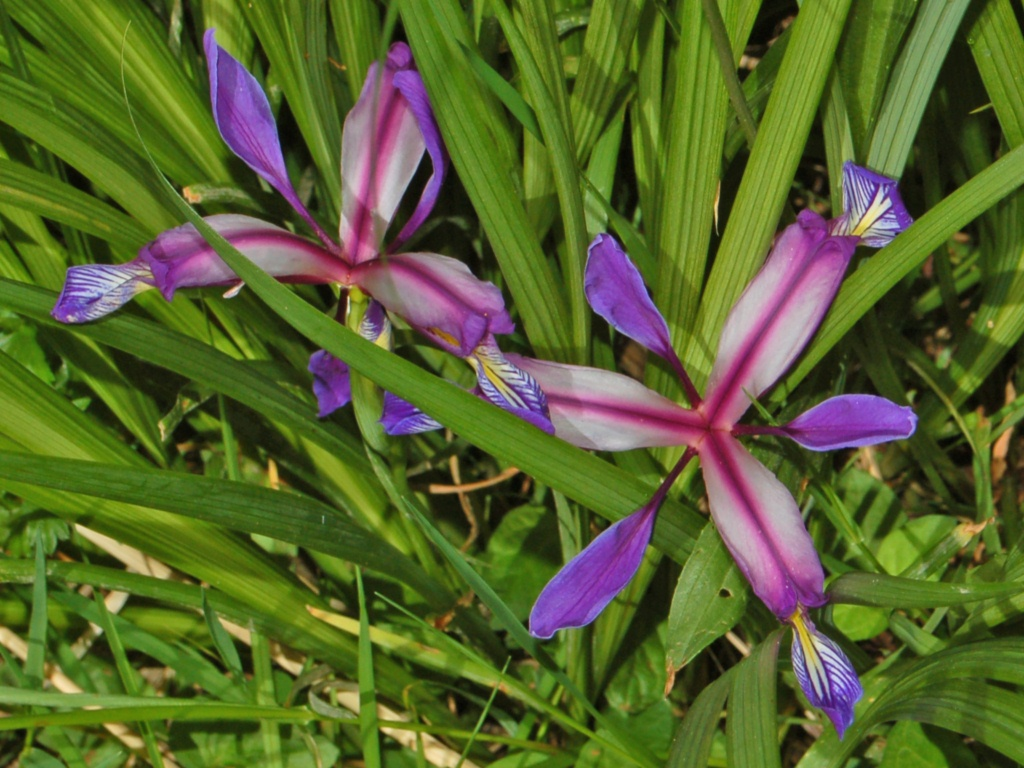

Scientific classification
- Kingdom: Plantae
- Clade: Tracheophytes
- Clade: Angiosperms
- Clade: Monocots
- Order: Asparagales
- Family: Iridaceae
- Genus: Iris
- Subgenus: Iris subg. Limniris
- Section: Iris sect. Limniris
- Series: Iris ser. Spuriae
- Species: I. graminea

Binomial name
- Iris graminea L.

Synonyms
- Chamaeiris graminea (L.) Medik.; Xiphion gramineum (L.) Schrank, Flora 7(2 Beibl.): 17 (1824).; Limniris graminea (L.) Fuss, Fl. Transsilv.: 637 (1866).; Xyridion gramineum (L.) Klatt, Bot. Zeitung (Berlin) 30: 500 (1872).; Iris compressa Moench, Methodus: 529 (1794), nom. Illeg.; Iris suavis Salisb., Prodr. Stirp. Chap. Allerton: 44 (1796).; Iris sylvatica Balb. ex Roem. & Schult., Syst. Veg. 1: 476 (1817).; Iris adamii Willd. ex Link, Jahrb. Gewächsk. 1(3): 72 (1820).; Iris bayonnensis Gren. & Godr., Fl. France 3: 243 (1855).; Iris pseudocyperus Schur, Enum. Pl. Transsilv.: 657 (1866).; Iris pseudograminea Schur, Enum. Pl. Transsilv.: 928 (1866).; Iris lamprophylla Lange, Bot. Tidsskr. 13: 17 (1882).; Iris nikitensis Lange, Bot. Tidsskr. 13: 17 (1882).; Xiphion collinum N.Terracc.; Xiphion gramineum subsp. gramineum (L.) Schrank; Xiphion gramineum subsp. silvaticum (Balb.) Arcang.

= Iris graminea =

Species of iris

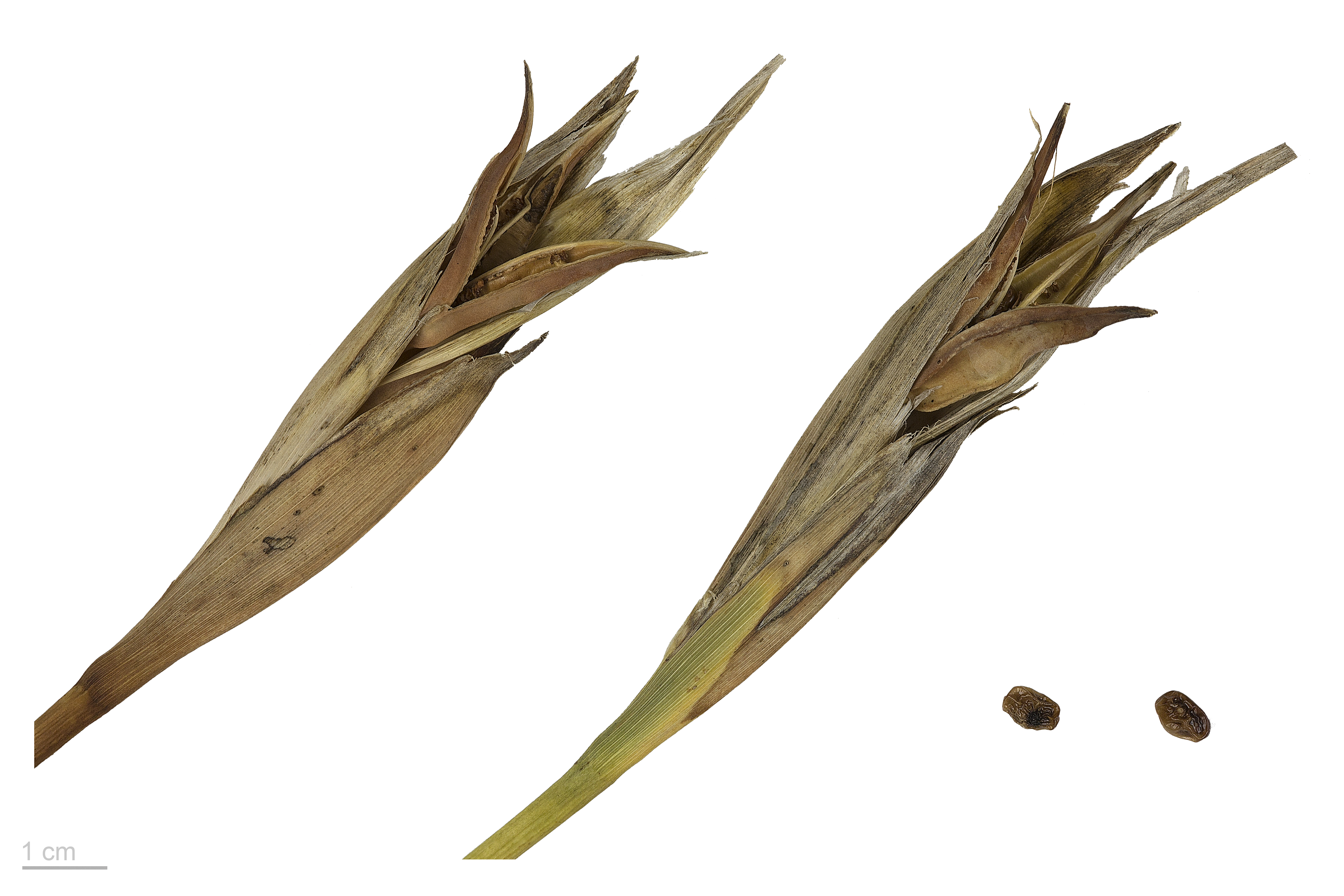
Iris graminea – MHNT

Iris graminea is a species of flowering plant belonging to the subgenus Limniris of the genus Iris, in particular the series Spuriae. It is a rhizomatous perennial, with purple or violet blue flowers almost hidden by narrow, grass-like leaves, and a plum scented fragrance. It is cultivated as an ornamental plant in temperate regions. It has several common names, including grass-leaved flag, grass leaved iris, plum iris and plum tart iris (due to its scent). This species naturally occurs in the southern half of Europe, from Spain and France in the West to Russia and the Caucasus in the East.

== Description ==
Iris graminea has hard and slender rhizomes, narrow grass-like foliage and can grow up to 30–100 cm (12–39 in) long and 0.5–1.5 cm wide. They can have many branches creating dense tufts, clumps or tussocks of plants.

The flower has bright purple flowers and shiny, green leaves that are longer than the flowering stems. They have strongly visible longitudinal veins. After the plant has flowered, the foliage has the tendency to extend, and later, the deciduous foliage dies back during the winter.

Iris graminea has a flattened stem that grows up to 10–60 cm (4–24 in) long. The stems have 1–2 spathes, which are unequal in size, the lower spathe being larger and rather leaf-like. The stems hold 1–2 terminal (top of stem) flowers, blooming in spring and summer, between May and June. The stems are normally unbranched, and the pedicel, is up to 6 cm long.

It has 2 pairs of petals, 3 large sepals, known as the 'falls', and 3 tepals, known as the 'standards'. The falls have a long haft (section closest to the stem), and a small rounded or oval blade, they are 3–5 cm (1–2 in) long. The centre of the blade has a pale yellow or white central area, which is veined with violet, purple, or blue. The claw is sometimes winged and tinged with green or brown, or veined deep reddish-purple.

It has an ovary with double ridges and a short perianth tube. After the iris has flowered, it produces a 3–4 cm (1–2 in) long seed capsule with pear-shaped seeds which are slightly compressed and flattened.

As most irises are diploid, having two sets of chromosomes, this can be used to identify hybrids and classification of groupings.

== Taxonomy ==
The Latin specific epithet graminea refers to grassy due to the grass-like leaves. It is also known as iris à feuilles de graminées or iris de Bayonne in France, and Giaggiolo susino in Italy.

It was originally published and described by Carl Linnaeus in Species Plantarum Vol. 1 page 39 on 1 May 1753. It was later published by Ker-Gawler in Curtis's Botanical Magazine Vol. 18 page 681 in 1803.

== Distribution ==
It is native to temperate areas of Europe, and Asia, being widespread from Spain to Russia. Within Asia, it is found in the Caucasus and in Turkey, while in Europe, it can be found in the West, South, and East.

It is usually found growing in scrubland, grasslands, meadows, open woods, and in rocky or gravelly soils of the mountains.

== Conservation ==
I. graminea is considered an endangered species in the Czech Republic and in Slovakia, vulnerable in Hungary, and rare within Saxony. I. graminea is thought to be extinct in Poland, but was formerly found near Cieszyn.

== Cultivation ==
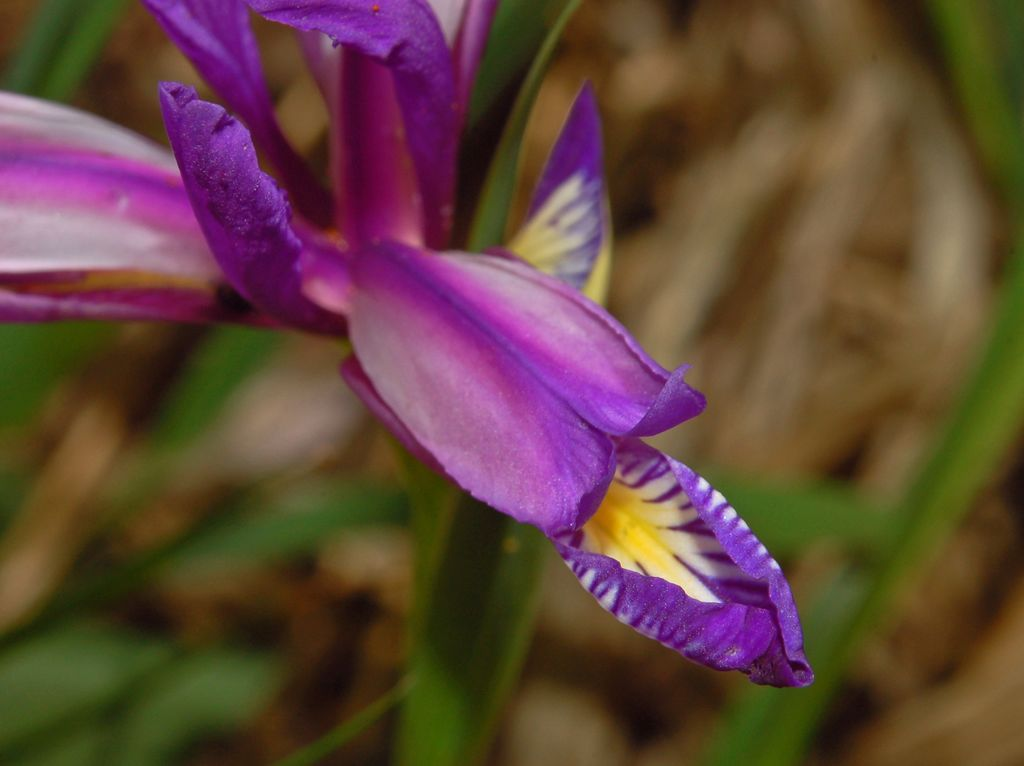
The flower of the Iris graminea

I. graminea is hardy between USDA Zones 3 and 9 and Europe Zone H2. It can survive temperatures as low as −20 °C. During the winter, the foliage dies back, leaving the rhizome under the ground. In very cold climates, a mulch may help the plant survive.

It can be grown in normal garden conditions. They prefer neutral to slightly acidic, well drained, and fertile soils. They can tolerate dry, clay or heavy soils, but it prefers damp ones. They favor positions in full sun, and can tolerate partial shade. It requires adequate watering during growth, such as a moist spring and then drier during the summer.

It suffers from no serious insect or disease problems. Crown rot is an infrequently occurring disease problem. It is susceptible to certain viruses, such as bacterial leaf blight, soft rot, rhizome rot, leaf spot, rust, viruses and scorch. It can also be susceptible to damage by insects such as; flies, weevils, moths, thrips, slugs, snails, aphids, and nematodes.

The plant has been cultivated since at least 1568. It was first grown in Cambridge Botanic Garden in 1733, where it was labelled as narrow leafed plum scent iris. For many years it was also grown in St. Petersburg Botanical Garden, and the botanical garden of Ufa.

=== Propagation ===
It can be propagated by division or by seed growing. It rarely needs lifting and dividing. Large clumps of mature plants can be lifted between mid-summer to early autumn, then divided before being replanted. As it does not like root disturbance, seed growing is preferred. If re-planted, they can take a year to settle before beginning to bloom again.

Seeds are collected from the pods after flowering, which are then sown in containers on a cold frame between September and May.

== Hybrids and cultivars ==
Iris graminea has the following known varieties: 'Achtaroffii', 'Adami', 'Colchica', 'Graminea Lamprophylla', 'Graminea Sylvatica', 'Graminea latifolia', 'Gravenia', 'Hort's variety', and 'Pseudocyperus'. The latter of these has ranges from the Czech Republic, Romania, and Slovakia.

== Sources ==
- Pignatti, Sandro (1982). Flora d'Italia (PDF). Vol. 3 (1st ed.). Bologna: Edagricole. ISBN 978-88-506-5244-0.
- Aldén, Björn (2009-03-20). Våra kulturväxters namn – ursprung och användning [Names of our cultivated plants – origin and use] (in Swedish). Formas. ISBN 978-9154060269.
  - Ryman, Svengunnar; Aldén, Björn; Hjertson, Mats; Olofsson, Sofie. "Svensk kulturväxtdatabas, SKUD" [Swedish cultivated plant database, SKUD]. SKUD.
- Czerepanov, Sergeĭ Kirillovich (1995). Vascular Plants of Russia and Adjacent States (the Former USSR). Cambridge University Press. ISBN 978-0521450065. (hbk) ISBN 978-0521044837 (pbk).
- Mathew, Brian (1981). The Iris. London: B.T. Batsford. OCLC 8201438.
- "Vol. 21, No. 11, Jun. 1, 1971". BioScience. Oxford University Press on behalf of the American Institute of Biological Sciences. JSTOR i255454.
  - Komarov, V. L. et al., eds. 1934–1964. Flora SSSR.
  - Tutin, T. G. et al., eds. 1964–1980. Flora Europaea.
