= Hisao Migo =

Japanese botanist

- Born: 1900
- Died: 1985 (aged 84–85)
- Scientific career
- Fields: botany
- Author abbrev. (botany): Migo

Hisao Migo (御江 久夫 Migo Hisao, 1900–1985) was a Japanese botanist.

Hisao Migo was employed at the Shanghai Science Institute from 1933 to 1945 during the Japanese occupation of Shanghai. During his employment at the Institute he made several botanical collecting trips to southern Jiangsu and northern Zhejiang.

In 1936, Koiti Kimura identified 20 different species of Dendrobium being sold as shi-hu in Chinese markets, and with Hisao Migo he described a species new to science, D. crispulum, picked up from the drug market (Kimura and Migo, 1936).

== Selected publications ==
- Hisao Migo. 1973. Memoranda phytotaxonomica, I. 10 pp.
- Hisao Migo. 1966. A note on Shibataea. 70 pp.
- Hisao Migo. 1956. Cyperaceae of Dr. Migo's Central Chinese collection, with Jisaburō Ōi & Tetsuo Koyama. Reprinted edition. 32 pp.
- Hisao Migo. 1943. On some Chinese species of Dicalix. Volume 13, Nº 3 of Shanghai Sizenkagaku Kenkyūsyo Ihō, published by Shanghai Science Institute, 12 pp.
- Hisao Migo. 1939. Notes on the flora of south-eastern China V. Nº 17 of Notes, published by The Journal of the Shanghai Science Institute, 12 pp.
- Hisao Migo. 1937a. On some plants from eastern China. Reprinted edition. 232 pp.
- Hisao Migo. 1937b. Notes on the flora of south-eastern China, III. Volume 3, Nº 8 of Journal of the Shanghai Science Institute, section 3. published by Shanghai Science Institute, 8 pp.
- Hisao Migo. 1936. New species of Dendrobium from the chinese drug Shih-hu. Volume 3 of The J. of the Shanghai Science Institute, with Kôiti Kimura, 124 pp.
- Hisao Migo. 1934. Notes of the Flora of Southeastern China I. Studies from the Department of Biology of the Shanghai Science Institute, published by The Journal of the Shanghai Science Institute, 9 pp.

== Eponyms ==
- (Poaceae) Indocalamus migoi Nakai
- (Poaceae) Sasamorpha migoi Nakai
- (Symplocaceae) Symplocos migoi Nagam.
