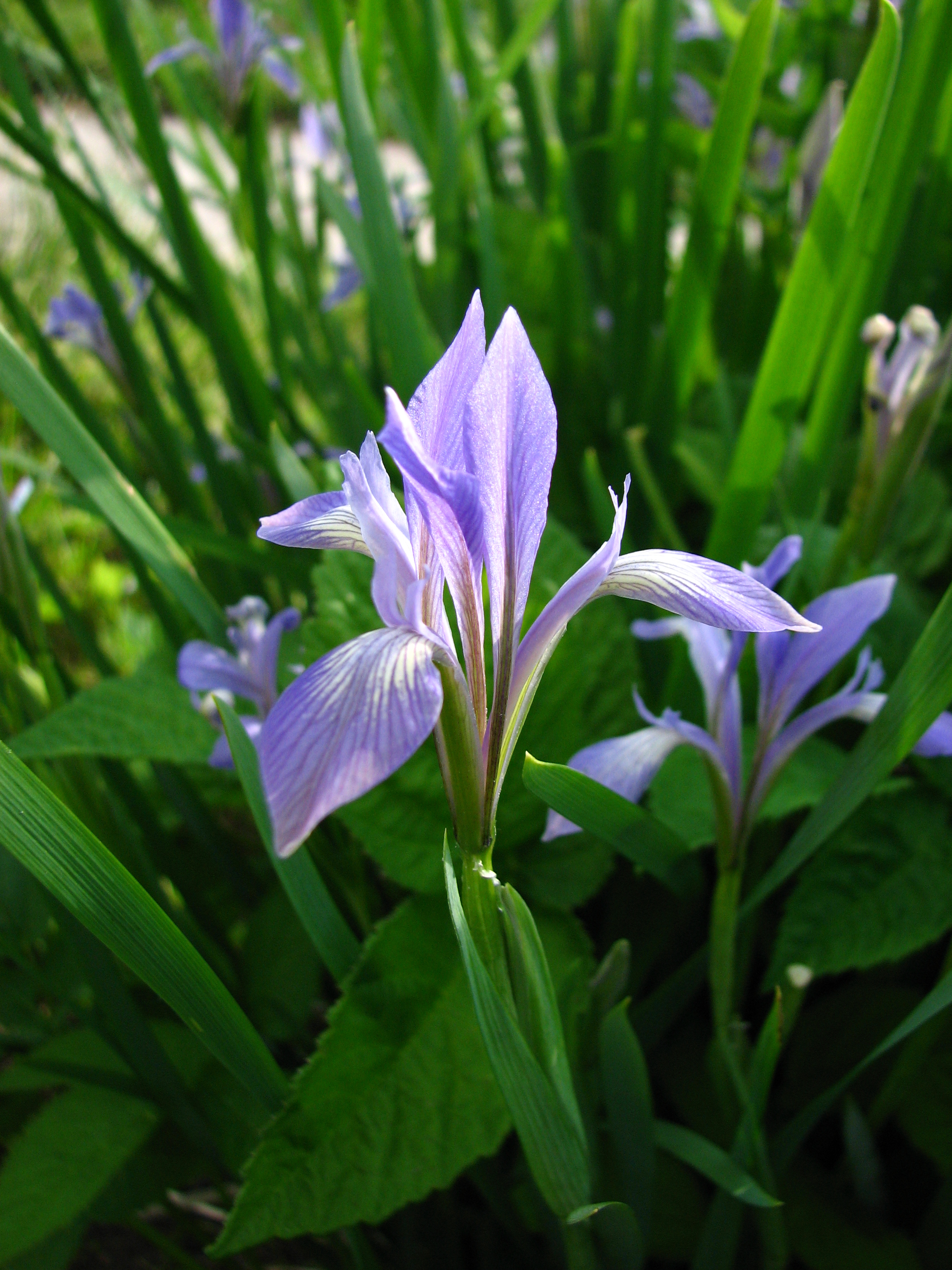

Scientific classification
- Kingdom: Plantae
- Clade: Embryophytes
- Clade: Tracheophytes
- Clade: Spermatophytes
- Clade: Angiosperms
- Clade: Monocots
- Order: Asparagales
- Family: Iridaceae
- Genus: Iris
- Subgenus: Iris subg. Limniris
- Section: Iris sect. Limniris
- Series: Iris ser. Ensatae
- Species: I. lactea

Binomial name
- Iris lactea Pall.

Synonyms
- Eremiris lactea (Pall.) Rodion.; Iris fragrans Lindl. (Illegitimate); Iris haematophylla Fisch. ex Link; Iris lactea var. lactea (Unknown); Iris longispatha Fisch. ex Sims; Iris moorcroftiana Wall. ex D.Don; Iris oxypetala C.A.Mey.(Illegitimate); Iris sibirica var. haematophylla (Fisch. ex Link) Turcz.; Iris sibirica subsp. triflora (Balb.) Nyman; Iris triflora Balb.; Joniris fragrans Klatt; Joniris longispatha (Fisch. ex Sims) Klatt; Joniris triflora (Balb.) Klatt; Xiphion triflorum (Balb.) Alef.

= Iris lactea =

Species of plant

Iris lactea is a species in the genus Iris. It is also in the subgenus Limniris and is the only species in the series Ensatae. The Japanese water iris, Iris ensata, is actually in series Laevigatae. It is a rhizomatous perennial, from central Asia, with pale blue or violet flowers. It is cultivated as an ornamental plant in temperate regions.

== Description ==
Iris lactea has a thick creeping rhizome, that is covered in reddish purple fibres.

It grows to a height of between, 3–50 cm (1–18 in), with a 10–30 cm (4–12 in) flowering stem.

It has 2–4 flowers per stem, blooming between April and June, or May and August in the UK. The violet scented flowers, can last for 2–3 weeks, and measure about 5–7.5 cm in diameter.

It has lanceolate (lance-shaped), green spathes, measuring 4.5–10 x 0.8–1.6 cm.

The flowers come in a range of shades from pale blue to violet, white or yellow. It has dark standards, delicate white falls, which are striated with blue, red-purple or violet.

It has flower stalks (pedicel) measure about 4–7 cm long, with a very short perianth tube (3 mm), 2.5–3.2 cm stamens and yellow anthers.

The leaves are linear, mostly ribbed, greyish green, rising from the base of the plant. They are between 14–70 cm long and between 3–7 mm wide.

It fruits (makes seeds) between June and September (after flowering), the seed capsule is narrow and cylindrical in shape, with 6 ribs running along the side of the capsule, which ends in a beak-like point. The capsule measures 6.5–7.5 × 1–1.4 cm. The fruiting stems are unequal, ranging from 4–10 cm. Inside the capsule, are maroon-brown seeds which are pyriform (pear shaped).

=== Biochemistry ===
In 2008, a study was carried out on the anatomical structure of the leaf and drought resistance of 4 different species of Iris (Iris songarica, Iris potaninii, Iris loczyi and Iris lactea) from Qinghai, China. It showed that all the species were strongly adaptable to drought conditions.

=== Genetics ===
In 2009, a karyotype analysis was carried out on 10 irises found in China, it found the chromosome counts, including Iris lactea of 2n=40.

As most irises are diploid, having two sets of chromosomes, this can be used to identify hybrids and classification of groupings. It has a chromosome count of 2n=40, 44, 50.

== Taxonomy ==
It is commonly known in the UK as the 'white flowered iris' or in the US as 'milky iris'. It is known as 'nomajiris', in Sweden.

In Ladakhi of Tibet, it is known as 'Tesmamentok', meaning pale purple flower.

The Latin specific epithet Lactea means milky color, hence the common name 'milky iris'.

In China, it is written as 白花马蔺 白花马蔺 in Chinese script and known as 'bai hua ma lin' in Pidgin in China. It also known as Ma Lin or Malan flower.

It was first published and described by Pallas in 'Reise Russ. Reich' (Reise durch Verschiedene Provinzen des Russischen Reichs – translated as 'Travel through various provinces of the Russian Empire') in 1776.

The taxonomy of this species has been very confused. It was originally named Iris ensata lactea (Thunberg) in 'Transactions of the Linnean Society of London' (page 328) on 1 May 1794 but later Iris ensata was re-classified as Iris kaempferi, which is now a synonym of Iris ensata (within Iris series Laevigatae). Even Dykes in his books Iris Genus (1913) and Handbook of Iris (19 ) got the name incorrect and recorded it as 'Iris ensata'. Later, writers have tried to rectify the mistake. Fritz Kohlein in his book Iris (1987) called it 'Iris ensata auct. non Thunberg.'

Many new names were considered, but determining which name was first used and should have precedence has been difficult, so it has generally been left as Iris lactea (Pallas).

Iris lactea is an accepted name by the RHS, and it was verified by United States Department of Agriculture Agricultural Research Service on 2 October 2014.

== Distribution and habitat ==
Iris lactea comes from wide range of areas. It is native to temperate and tropical regions of Asia.

=== Range ===
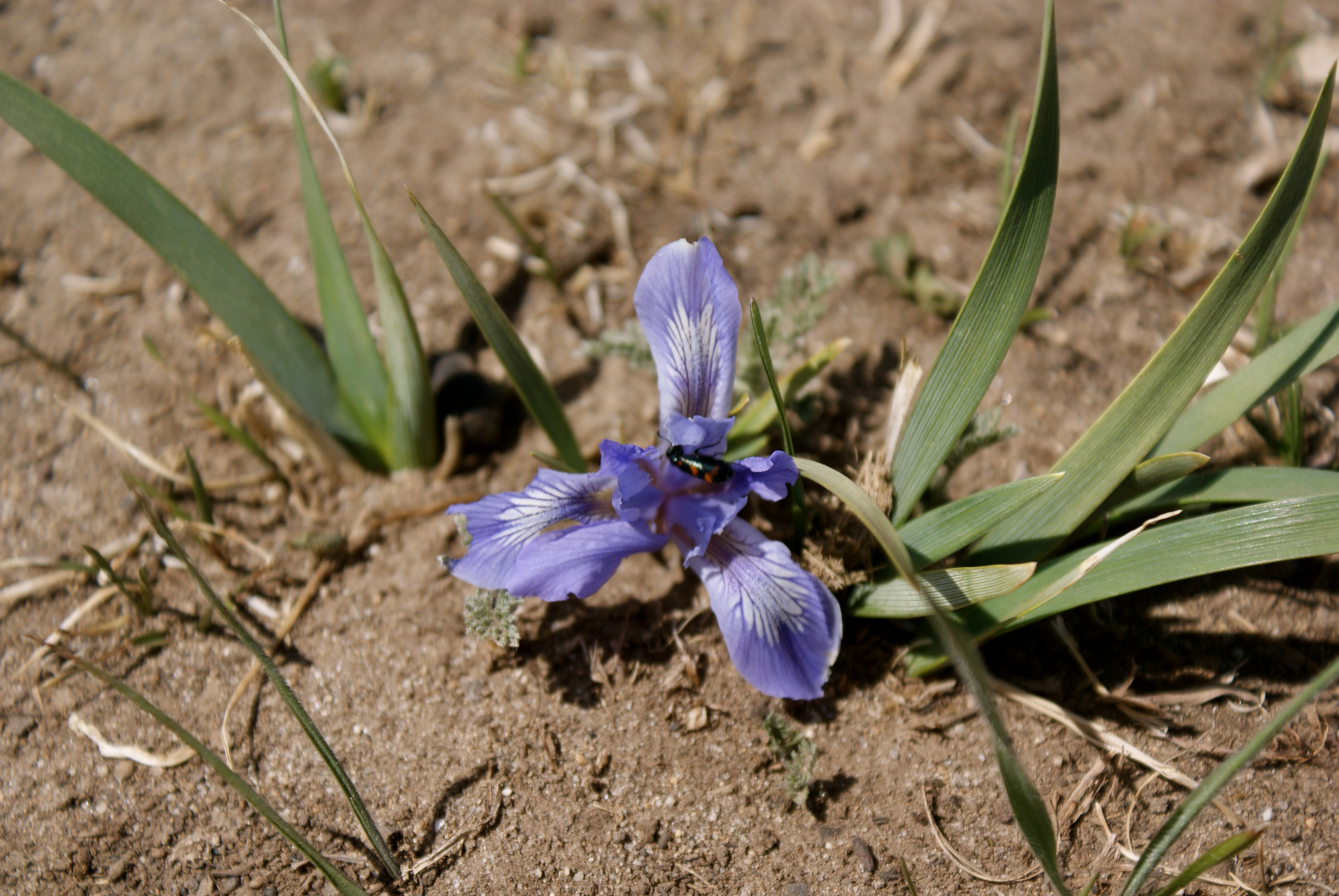
Iris lactea in Mongolia

It is found in Afghanistan, Kashmir (including Guraiz and Himachal Pradesh), Kazakhstan, Central Asia, India (including Ladakh), Pakistan, Russia (in Siberia and Primorye), Tibet, China, Mongolia and Korea. In China, it is found within the Chinese provinces of Anhui, Gansu, Hebei, Heilongjiang, Henan, Hubei, Jiangsu, Jilin, Liaoning, Nei Mongol, Ningxia, Qinghai, Shaanxi, Shandong, Shanxi, Sichuan, Xinjiang and Xi-zang (Chinese Tibet).

It is listed with Iris bloudowii, Iris humilis, Iris ruthenica, Iris sibirica, Iris tenuifolia and Iris tigridia as being found in the Altai-Sayan region (where Russia, China, Mongolia and Kazakhstan come together).

It is regarded as a wildflower in India and China.

=== Habitat ===
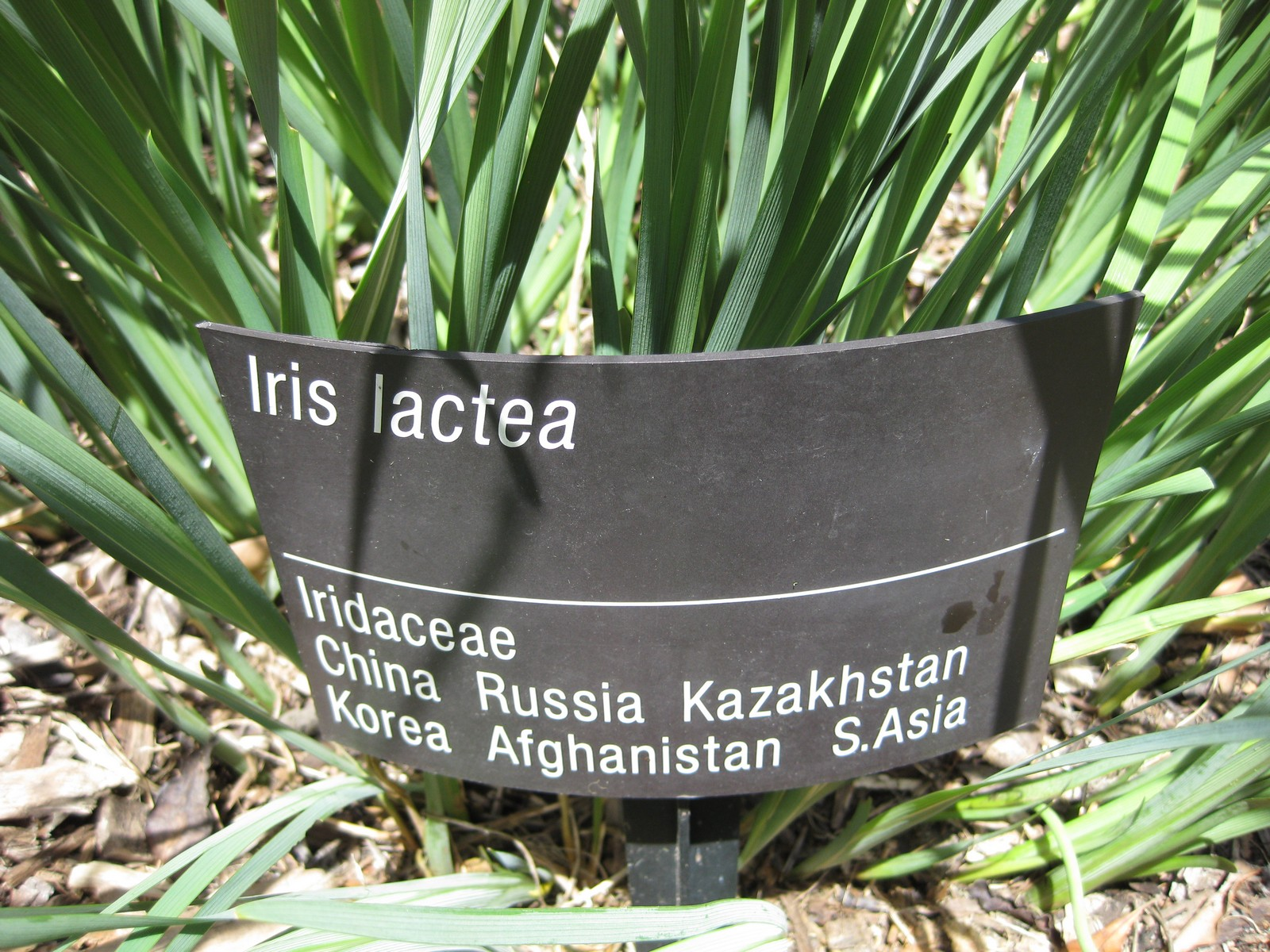
Plant label showing wide range of distribution

I. lactea grows in a wide range of habitats. Including steppe meadows, turf slopes, heavily grazed river shore within desert steppe, grasslands, roadsides, grassy slopes and hillsides.

It grows at altitudes of between 600–3800 m above sea level.

It flowers as late as late summer in the wild.

== Cultivation ==
Since Iris lactea, is one of the most common wild irises across all of China, living it a diverse range of habitats. It is very tolerant of most garden conditions.

It is hardy to USDA Zones 3–9.

It is very tolerant plant, growing in a variety of soils (including those that dry out in summer), salty areas and can be used as a soil improver. It prefers sunny places, but can grow successfully in shady places.

It has been planted in mass on high leaded soils to reduce the lead contamination.

It is suitable for cultivation in rock gardens and group planting.

=== Propagation ===
It can be propagated by seed and by division.

=== Hybrids and cultivars ===
Many of the synonyms may represent distinct varieties of lactea. The following is a list of named variations botanical and horticultural:

- 'Biglumis' (Robert Sweet, 1835, Siberia) – now called Iris lactea Pallas var. biglumis Koidz.)
- 'Chinensis' (which grows in Korea, Russia and India)
- 'Chrysantha' (yellow flowers)
- 'Ensata Chinensis'
- 'Ensata Grandiflora' (Dykes 1913)
- 'Ensata Grandiflora Alba' (white form of 'Ensata Grandiflora', found at Ohio State University Bot. Garden 1933)
- 'Hyacinthiana' (Collected by Reginald Farrer, 1914–1915, Tibet or W. China-Kansu)
- 'Iliensis' (Poljakov, From near the Ili River, Kazakhstan)
- 'Illini Fountain' (1993, Budapest, Hungary)
- 'Mani' (1935, Tibet)
- 'Moorcroftiana' (Wallich 1828)
- 'Pabularia' (1888, Kashmir)
- 'Redundant' (2002, Denver Botanic Garden)
- var. lactea (white flowers, with purple veins and pale violet inner segments)

Iris lactea has been used in hybridization for the selection of dwarf bearded irises.

Known hybrids:

- 'Calsata Hybrids' (Tomas Tamberg, 1979, cross of Iris douglasiana × Iris ensata)
- 'Chrysata Charme' (Tamberg, 2001, cross of Sino-sibirica × I. lactea)
- 'Hamadryad' (1931, Iris 'Watsoniana' × Iris ensata)

== Uses ==
It is widely grown throughout China, where it is often used as an ingredient in a herbal contraceptive. It has also been used in the anti-cancer drug 'Irisquinone', which comes from a herbal remedy. The rhizomes are also used in traditional oriental medicine, including Tibet.

The leaves are used as fodder for animals, and for thatching, matting and basket work, and its leaf fibres are also used in paper making and for brushes. The flowers contain the pigment – anthocyanin.

It has also been used in veterinary medicine. The consumption of the flowers and seeds is thought to increase a cow's milk yield.

== Culture ==
In Afghanistan, it has been banned by the Taliban. This may be due to its use in herbal medicines.

== Sources ==
- Aldén, B., S. Ryman & M. Hjertson. 2009. Våra kulturväxters namn – ursprung och användning. Formas, Stockholm (Handbook on Swedish cultivated and utility plants, their names and origin).
- Chinese Academy of Sciences. 1959–. Flora reipublicae popularis sinicae.
- Czerepanov, S. K. 1995. Vascular plants of Russia and adjacent states (the former USSR).
- Huxley, A., ed. 1992. The new Royal Horticultural Society dictionary of gardening.
- Khassanov, F. O. & N. Rakhimova. 2012. Taxonomic revision of the genus Iris L. (Iridaceae Juss.) for the flora of Central Asia. Stapfia 97:175.
- Kitagawa, M. 1979. Neo-lineamenta florae Manshuricae.
- Komarov, V. L. et al., eds. 1934–1964. Flora SSSR. [= I. ensata Thunb.].
- Mathew, B. 1981. The Iris. 125–127.
- Nasir, E. & S. I. Ali, eds. 1970–. Flora of [West] Pakistan.
- Waddick, J. W. & Zhao Yu-tang. 1992. Iris of China.
- Walters, S. M. et al., eds. 1986–. European garden flora.
