= Cold frame =

Glass-topped box to protect young plants

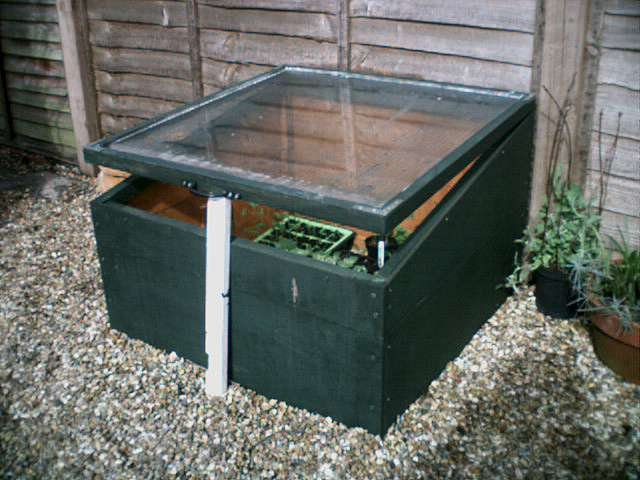
A traditional homemade cold frame

In agriculture and gardening, a cold frame is a transparent-roofed enclosure, built low to the ground, used to protect plants from adverse weather, primarily excessive cold or wet. The transparent top admits sunlight and prevents heat escape via convection that would otherwise occur, particularly at night. Essentially, a cold frame functions as a miniature greenhouse to extend the growing season.

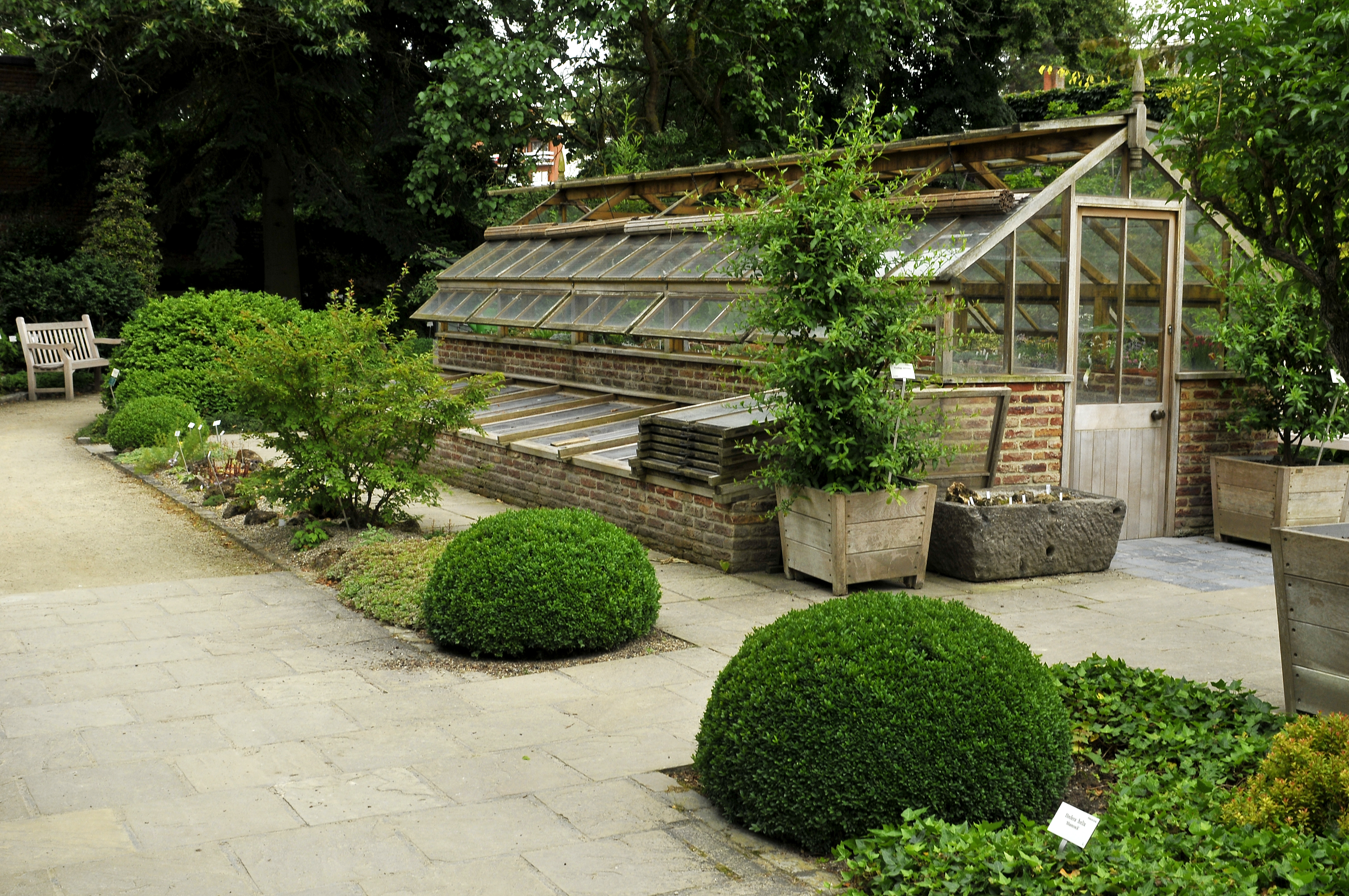
Cold frame as a part of a greenhouse

Historically, cold frames were built to be used in addition to a heated greenhouse. The name itself exemplifies the distinction between the warm greenhouse and the unheated cold frame. They were frequently built as part of the greenhouse's foundation brickwork along the southern wall (in northern latitudes). This allowed seeds to be germinated in the greenhouse and then easily moved to the attached cold frame to be "hardened-off" before final planting outside. Cold frames are similar to some enclosed hotbeds, also called hotboxes. The difference is in the amount of heat generated inside. This is parallel to the way that some greenhouses are called "hothouses" to emphasize their higher temperature, achieved either by the solar effects alone or by auxiliary heating via a heater or HVAC system of some kind.

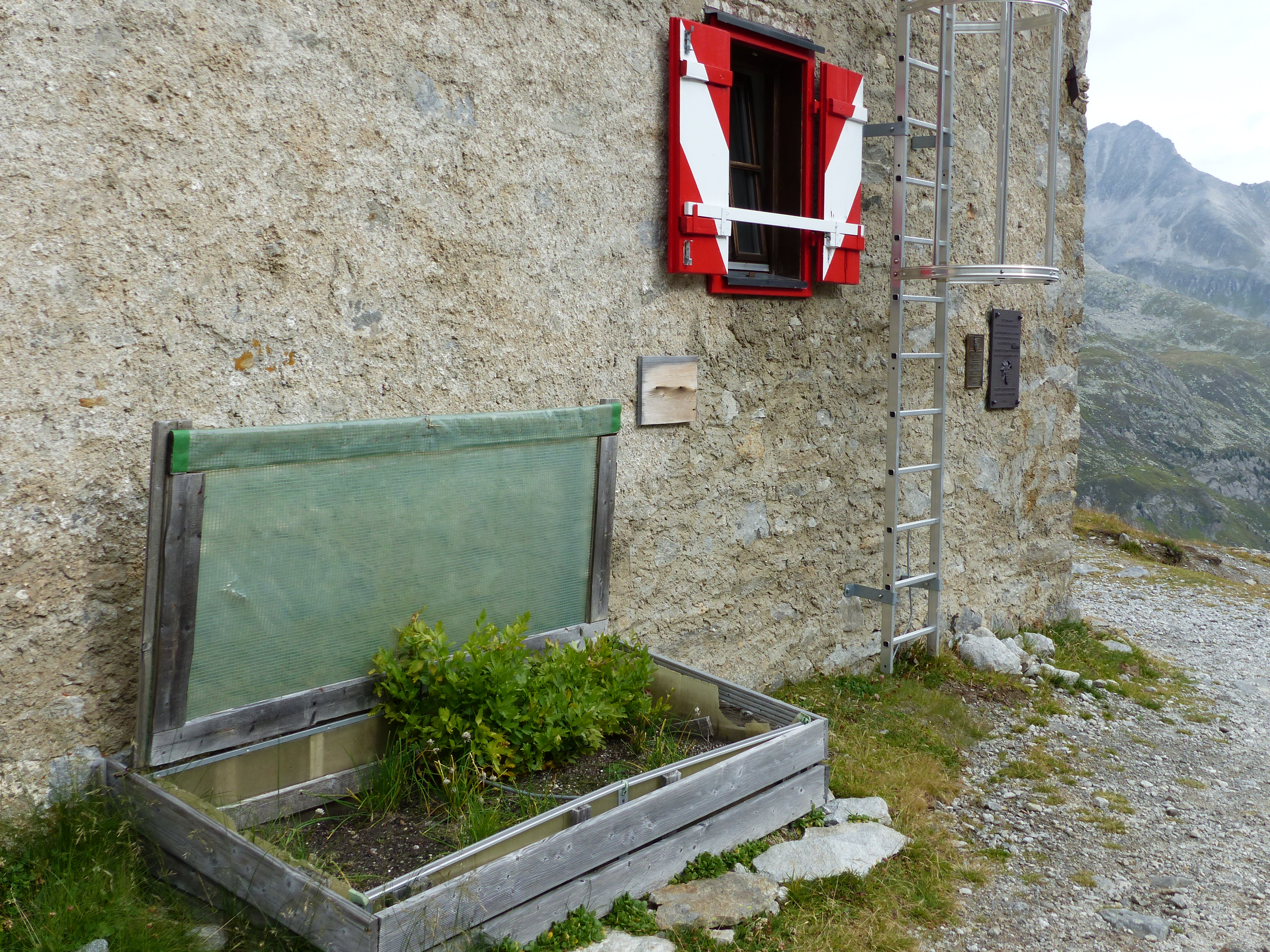
Cold frame on the side of Richterhütte in Austria

Cold frames are found in home gardens and in vegetable farming. They create microclimates that provide several degrees of air and soil temperature insulation, and shelter from wind. In cold-winter regions, these characteristics allow plants to be started earlier in the spring, and to survive longer into the fall and winter. They are most often used for growing seedlings that are later transplanted into open ground, and can also be a permanent home to cold-hardy vegetables grown for autumn and winter harvest.

== Construction ==
Cold frame construction is a common home or farm building project, although kits and commercial systems are available. A traditional plan makes use of old glass windows: a wooden frame is built, about one to two feet tall, and the window placed on top. The roof is often sloped towards the winter sun to capture more light, and to improve runoff of water, and hinged for easy access. Clear plastic, rigid or sheeting, can be used in place of glass. An electric heating cable, available for this purpose, can be placed in the soil to provide additional heat.

== Uses ==
Cold frames can be used to extend the growing season for many food and ornamental crops, primarily by providing increased warmth in early spring. This means that it's possible to harvest vegetable crops ahead of their normal season when they are extremely expensive to buy. Some crops suitable for growing in a cold frame include lettuces, parsley, salad onions, spinach, radishes and turnips etc. One vegetable crop can occupy the whole of a cold frame or a combination of crops can be grown so that they mature in rotation in order to get a wide range of different vegetables throughout the year from a single cold frame.

== Bulb frame ==
A "bulb frame" is a specialized kind of cold frame, designed for growing hardy or almost hardy ornamental bulbous plants, particularly in climates with wet winters. Typically it is raised further above ground level than a normal cold frame, so that the plants can be seen better when in flower. They are often used for the cultivation of winter-growing bulbs which flower in the autumn or spring. The covers are used in winter to provide some protection from very bad weather, while allowing good ventilation. Then in the summer, the covers provide dry, warm conditions which many such bulbs need.

== See also ==
- Greenhouse
- High tunnel
