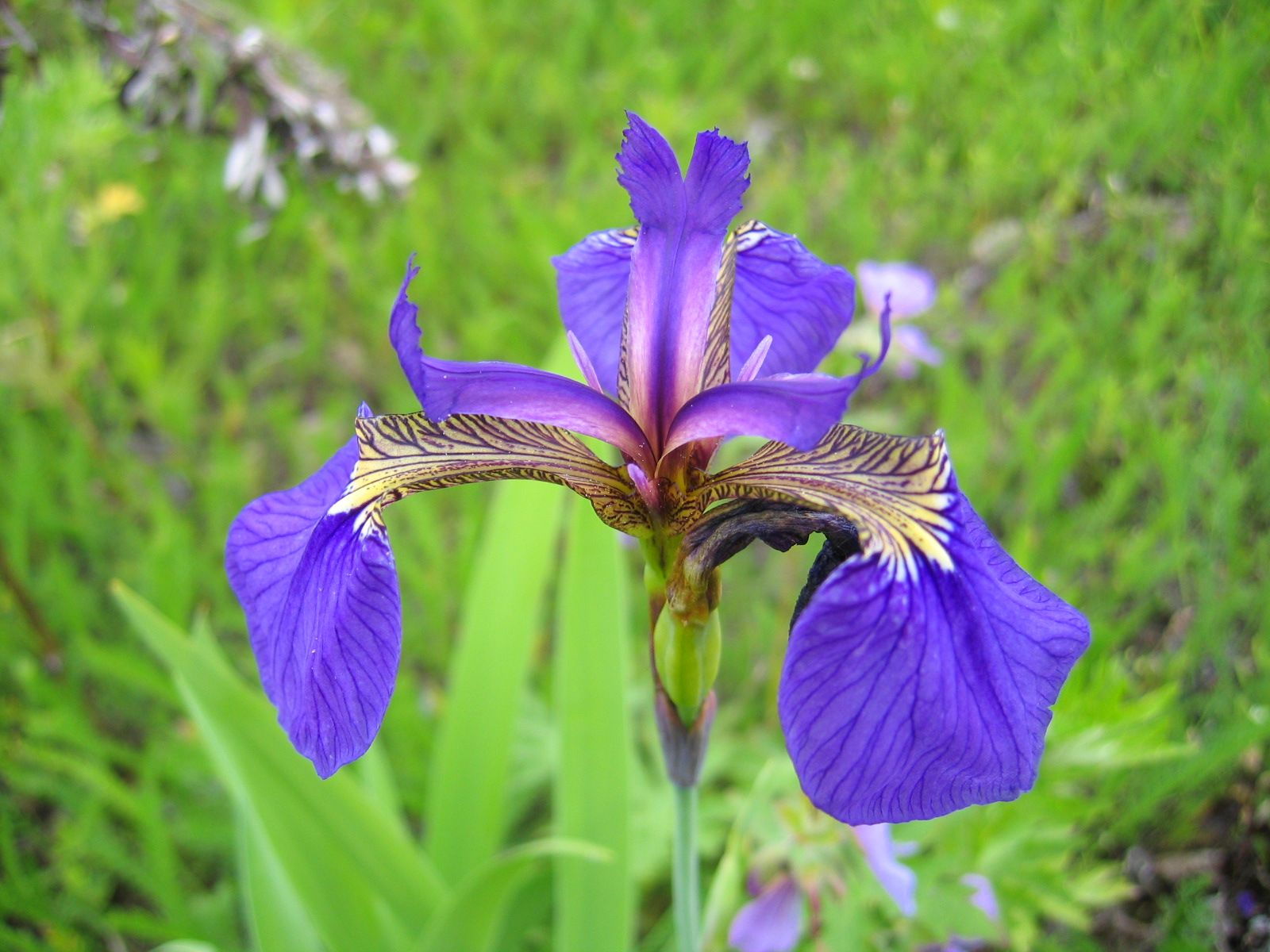

Scientific classification
- Kingdom: Plantae
- Clade: Embryophytes
- Clade: Tracheophytes
- Clade: Angiosperms
- Clade: Monocots
- Order: Asparagales
- Family: Iridaceae
- Genus: Iris
- Subgenus: Iris subg. Limniris
- Section: Iris sect. Limniris
- Series: Iris ser. Tripetalae
- Species: I. setosa

Binomial name
- Iris setosa Pall. ex Link

Synonyms
- Iris arctica Eastw.; Iris brachycuspis Fisch. ex Sims; Iris brevicuspis Fisch. ex Schult.; Iris interior (E.S.Anderson) Czerep.; Iris setosa var. interior E.S.Anderson; Iris setosa subsp. interior (E.S.Anderson) Hultén; Iris setosa var. platyrhyncha Hultén; Iris setosa subsp. setosa; Iris setosa var. setosa; Iris yedoensis Franch. & Sav.; Limniris setosa (Pall. ex Link) Rodion.; Xiphion brachycuspis (Fisch. ex Sims) Alef.; Xyridion setosum (Pall. ex Link) Klatt

= Iris setosa =

Species of flowering plant

Iris setosa, known as the beachhead iris or bristle-pointed iris, among other common names, is a species of flowering plant in the genus Iris of the family Iridaceae. This species belongs to the subgenus Limniris and the series Tripetalae. The plant is a rhizomatous perennial found in a wide range across and below the Arctic Circle; this range includes the United States (Alaska and Maine), Canada (including British Columbia, Newfoundland, Quebec, and Yukon), Russia (including Siberia), China, Korea, and Japan. The plant has tall branching stems; mid-green leaves; and flowers that are violet, purple-blue, violet-blue, blue, or lavender (or rarely, pink or white).

== Description ==
Iris setosa is similar in form to a miniature Japanese iris, or a shorter-lived dwarf version of Iris sibirica.

The shallowly rooted, large, branching rhizomes spread with time to create large clumps. These rhizomes are grey-brown, thick, and covered with the remains of the previous season's fibrous leaves.

Iris setosa has branched stems that are variable in height, ranging from 10 cm (5 in) to 1 m (3 ft) tall. The larger plants can grow beyond the height of the leaves. The roundish stems are 1.5–9.0 cm (0.6–4 in) in diameter with 1 to 3 branches.

Iris setosa has grass-like, lanceolate (sword-shaped), medium-green leaves with a purple-tinged base. The plant's leaves can measure 30–60 cm (12–24 in) long by 0.8–2.5 cm (0.3–1 in) wide.

The plant bears 3–4 flowers per stem—for a total of between 6 and 13 on the whole plant— in groups of 3. It blooms between June and July.

The large flowers measure 5–8 cm (3–6 in) across, usually 7–8 cm (2.8–3.1 in). Depending on their location, they bloom in a range of shades including violet, purple-blue, violet-blue, blue, and lavender. Very occasionally, there are pink or white forms.

Like other irises, the plant has two sets of three petals: three large sepals (outer petals), known as the "falls", and three smaller inner petals (or tepals), known as the "standards". The sepals can be deeply veined dark purple with a yellow-white center, known as the "signal". The small standards appear almost as bristles, which gives the flower a flat, three-petaled appearance.

The perianth tube (floral tube) is about 1 cm (0.4 in) long, normally dark blue-violet to red-purple with darker veins.

The plant is self-fertilizing (a hermaphrodite) and can also be pollinated by insects. The stamens are about 2 cm (0.8 in) long with purple anthers, and the ovary is about 1 cm (0.4 in) long.

After the flowers finish blooming, the seeds ripen between August and September. These seeds are contained within a green seed capsule (measuring 2.5 cm by 1.25 cm), which is loculicidal or cylindrical, and it turns pale brown when it ripens. It has six ribs along its sides.

The pale-brown to dark-red seeds, about 2–3 mm in size, have a distinct raised raphe (tissue ridge) along the length of one edge.

=== Biochemistry ===
In 2012, a genetic study was performed on Iris laevigata and several closely related species; these include Iris ensata, Iris setosa, Iris halophila, Iris scariosa, Iris potaninii, Iris tenuifolia, Iris bloudowii, and Iris sanguinea. Flavonoids (a class of metabolites) have also been analysed from the flowers and leaves of the Iris japonica, Iris pseudacorus, Iris gracilipes, and Iris setosa.

Most irises are diploid (having two sets of chromosomes), and this characteristic can be used to identify hybrids and classify groupings. Most Iris setosa specimens have a chromosome count of 2n=38, which was determined by scientist Marc Simonet in 1934. However, specimens from the Primorskii Krai region in Russia were found to have a chromosome count of 2n=28.

Chromosomal research has found that a progenitor of Iris setosa and a progenitor of Iris virginica were the parents of Iris versicolor.

== Nomenclature and taxonomy ==
The name setosa is derived from the Latin word seta, meaning "bristle" or "hairy". This refers to the true petals ("standards") of the flower, which—compared to other Iris species—are nearly imperceptible.

Iris setosa has several common names, including the following:

- beachhead iris, because of its tolerance for salt air or maritime conditions, as well as its growth upon rocky shorelines, especially in Canada
- wild flag iris
- Alaska iris
- Arctic Iris or dwarf Arctic iris, because of its growth in the Arctic Circle (its scientific name was once Iris arctica)
- Arctic blue flag
- bristle-pointed iris (in the UK)

In Japan, the species is known as hiougi-ayame (檜扇菖蒲/ヒオウギアヤメ). In China, it is called "shan yuan wei" (山鸢尾).

The species is occasionally confused with Iris hookeri, perhaps because several synonyms of Iris hookeri are Iris setosa variants: Iris setosa var. canadensis Foster; Iris setosa f. pallidiflora Fernald; Iris setosa subsp. pygmaea C.E.Lundstr.; and Iris setosa f. zonalis Eames.

Iris setosa was first described by botanist Johann Link (based on an earlier description by botanist Peter Pallas) in Jahrbücher der Gewächskunde in Berlin and Leipzig during 1820. The species was originally described from specimens found in eastern Siberia. A second description was then published by botanist William Rickatson Dykes (Iris 1913, p. 92) as Iris brachycuspis. In 1824, the species was also described as Iris brachycuspis by Stephan Fischer and published by John Sims in the Botanical Magazine. The names Iris brachycuspis and Iris setosa are now regarded as synonyms.

Iris setosa is a name accepted by the Royal Horticultural Society, and it gained their Award of Garden Merit (RHS AGM).

This species is one of the three Iris species in the Iris flower data set outlined by Ronald Fisher in his 1936 paper "The use of multiple measurements in taxonomic problems" as an example of linear discriminant analysis.

== Distribution and habitat ==
=== Range ===
The only Iris species that is native to both Asia and North America, Iris setosa has a circumarctic distribution.

In the United States, the species ranges in Alaska from the northern Brooks Range to Southcentral Alaska and the coastal Aleutian Islands, and it is also found in Maine. In Canada, its range includes British Columbia, Newfoundland, Quebec, and the Yukon Territory.

In Russia, the range of the species includes near the lower Lena River in Siberia. In China, its range includes Manchuria and eastern Jilin. In Japan, its range includes Hokkaido and extends southward to Honshu. The species is also found in Korea.

The form of Iris setosa that grows in Canada is thought to be slightly different from the Asian form. In Canada, the species is found as far south as the shores of the Gulf of St. Lawrence and as far north as the estuary of Saint-Vallier, in Bellechasse County, Quebec.

Iris setosa is found in many of Alaska's national parks—including Glacier Bay, Kobuk Valley, Lake Clark, Wrangell–St. Elias, Katmai, and Kenai Fjords—and in Acadia National Park in Maine, though the range of the species is not limited to national parks. In Alaska, it is only found south of the Brooks Range.

In Japan, the species is present in large numbers in Akkeshi, in eastern Hokkaido, Japan.

=== Habitat ===
Iris setosa is normally considered a wetland plant, but it grows well in dry soil, too. The species is tolerant of many kinds of habitats, and can therefore be found in several habitats: in meadows, bogs, and swamps; beside rivers, streams, and lakes (especially on rocky shores); on beaches, dunes, and headlands; and in light woodland. The species can grow in gravelly soils and even sand. However, it is normally found at 1,500–2,500 m (4,900–8,200 ft) above sea level.

== Conservation ==
In 2014, two varieties of Iris setosa—hondoensis and nasuensis—were listed as critically threatened in Japan.

== Cultivation ==
Iris setosa can adapt to various conditions, except heavy clay soils that dry out in summer. The species prefers to grow in moist or wet soils; in addition, it can tolerate bog conditions, especially during the growing season, when it needs much moisture. The species dislikes soils containing lime. It prefers to grow in partial shade, because full sun risks drought conditions.

The species is also suited to sunny portions of woodland gardens or bog gardens. It is suitable for growing in front of a border. Miniature versions are also suitable for rock gardens or sinks.

As with other rhizomatous irises, the rhizome of Iris setosa should be planted with the top of the rhizome not covered by soil. If covered or planted too deep, the rhizome risks rotting.

In mild temperate areas, the plant's leaves are evergreen and can survive a winter. However, if the leaves are trimmed before winter to reduce wind interference and root disturbance, new leaves will emerge in the spring.

Some authors have suggested that irises are deer-proof. This is thought to be incorrect—it may be that leaves simply grow back after being eaten by deer.

Aphids Macrosiphum euphorbiae and Myzus ornatus can be found on the plant.

=== Hardiness ===
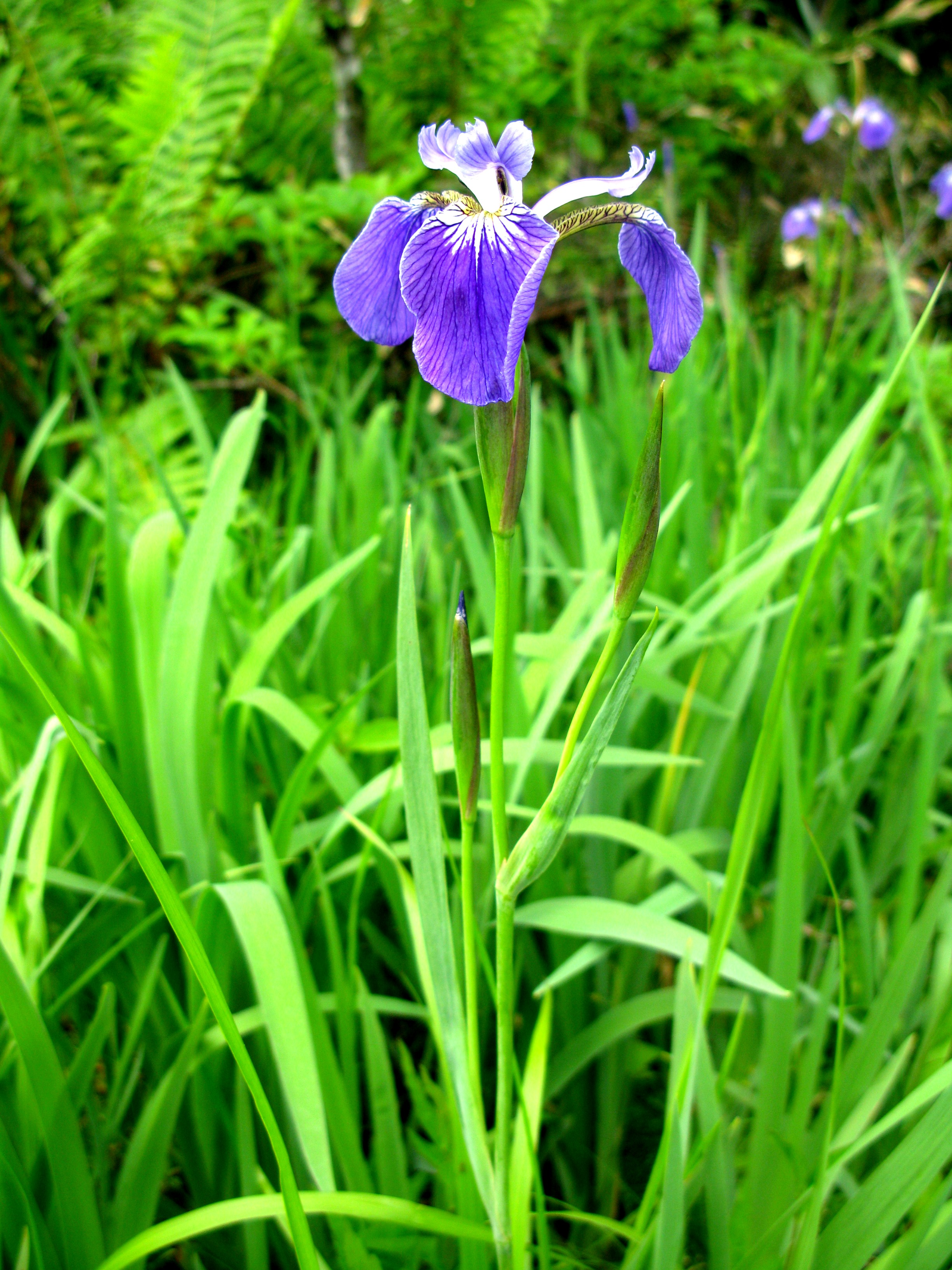
Iris setosa in Fukushima, Japan

Iris setosa is one of the hardiest species of irises, but it does not grow as well in warm climates because of its need for a cold dormant period during winter. As a native plant of Alaska, it is extremely tolerant of cold temperatures down to −30 °F (−34 °C). The plant would only be killed if it never experienced a summer.

The species is hardy to United States Department of Agriculture (USDA) Zone 3–7, 3–8, or 4–8, but it may tolerate Zone 2 and Zone 9 under perfect conditions.

== Propagation ==
Iris setosa can be propagated by seed or by division.

As with all irises, this species can be difficult to propagate from seed (in the United States). It is easier to do so by rhizome divisions, because the plant propagates naturally by rhizomes. Division is best undertaken during spring and autumn if possible, ideally in September (about 4–6 weeks after flowering). This division can be done annually, but it is better to do so every third year, or whenever the plant has spread enough that its center no longer produces any flowering stems. If the plant is only divided into thirds or quarters, the new divisions can be planted immediately; however, if it is divided into small sections to maximize propagation, these should be placed in a cold frame until the following spring, by which time they should have grown new roots.

The species is easier to grow from seed in the United Kingdom, because the seed requires a cold period (a freeze/thaw period). Seeds of the iris can be shaken from the seed capsule during mid-August. These seeds should be planted into beds or trays in a cold frame, sown into drills (furrows) 1/4 to 1/2 inch deep. If not sown immediately, the seeds should be frozen for storage. In the spring, when they are large enough to handle, the seedlings should be extracted and placed into individual pots. These can then be grown in a greenhouse or a cold frame for their first year, and then planted in their permanent locations during late spring or early summer. New plants should be planted in September. It takes at least two years to grow a plant from seed to flowering plant.

=== Hybrids and cultivars ===
In the wild, Iris setosa forms hybrids with I. versicolor, the larger blue flag iris. Specimens of such hybrids have been observed on Anticosti Island, Quebec. Iris setosa also hybridizes very easily with other Iris species, including Siberian and Californian irises, and is therefore often used by breeders of iris hybrids.

Many variants are known around the world, including three in Japan, each only found in limited areas of Honshu island.

==== Japanese variants ====
The hondoensis variety of Iris setosa was found in Hondo in 1930. This variety has large purple flowers and is low-branching, robust, and approximately 80 cm (31 in) high. The variety is assumed to be a hybrid with Iris laevigata. Var. hondoensis has chromosome numbers of 2n=54, but it may be triploid.

The nasuensis variety of Iris setosa, found near the city of Nasu, grows up to 1 m (39 in) tall. This variety has broader leaves than other varieties of Iris setosa and large flowers (similar to 'Iris laevigata'), but small bracts. Like var. hondoensis, var. nasuensis has chromosome numbers of 2n=54, but it may be triploid.

Iris 'Shiga Ayame' is a hybrid of the two species Iris setosa and Iris sanguinea. The hybrid was found in the Shiga Highlands near the city of Nagano in 1930 by botanists Fumito Yokouchi and Genichi Koidzumi; it was named after the area where it was discovered. The inner perianths of this iris are an intermediate type between those of its two parents.

Named cultivars of Iris setosa include the following:

- 'Kosho-en' (1984)—with white flowers.
- 'Kirigamini'—with rich, velvety blue-purple flowers.

== Medicinal and other uses ==
Herbalists have used the rhizome of Iris setosa for centuries as an ingredient in various medicines (similarly to the use of orris roots). However, all parts of Iris setosa are poisonous to humans when consumed raw. The rhizome contains iridin, which is an oleoresin; it can affect the liver and digestive organs, thereby causing vomiting, diarrhea, or allergic reactions such as severe rashes. The plant has been used by Alaska Natives as an ingredient in a poison put on arrowheads.

Although poisonous when eaten raw, the plant's starchy roots can be made safe for human consumption by cooking, and the plant is cultivated in Japan for these edible roots.

Some Inuit tribes in Alaska roast and grind the seeds of the iris for use as a coffee substitute. The Aleuts have made a drink from the roots for use as a laxative, though the Iñupiat people considered the whole plant poisonous.

Some traditional healers have made the roots into a tincture to help soothe lymphatic swelling. In addition, Iris setosa has been combined with Arnica plants to make an herbal oil to relieve bruises.

The flower petals of Iris setosa can be used to create a violet-blue dye when the plant is used with a chrome mordant (or fixing agent). These plants were also used as a grass dye for baskets. The rhizomes can also be used to extract a perfume, similar to the essence of violets.

== Sources ==
- Artyukova, E.V.; Kozyrenko, M.M.; Ilyushko, M.V.; Zhuravlev, Y.N.; Reunova, G.D. (2001). "Genetic Variability of Iris setosa". Molecular Biology. 35 (1): 134–138. doi:10.1023/A:1004823422785. S2CID 6451178.
- Iwashina, T.; Ootani, S. (1995). "Polyphenols in Iris setosa var. canadensis and their chemotaxonomic comparisons with three Japanese varieties". Annals of the Tsukuba Botanical Garden. 14: 35–41.
