= Khangai, Arkhangai =

District in Arkhangai Province, Mongolia

Coordinates: 47°51′12″N 99°25′42″E

Khangai District Хангай сум ᠬᠠᠩᠭ᠋ᠠᠢᠰᠤᠮᠤ
- District
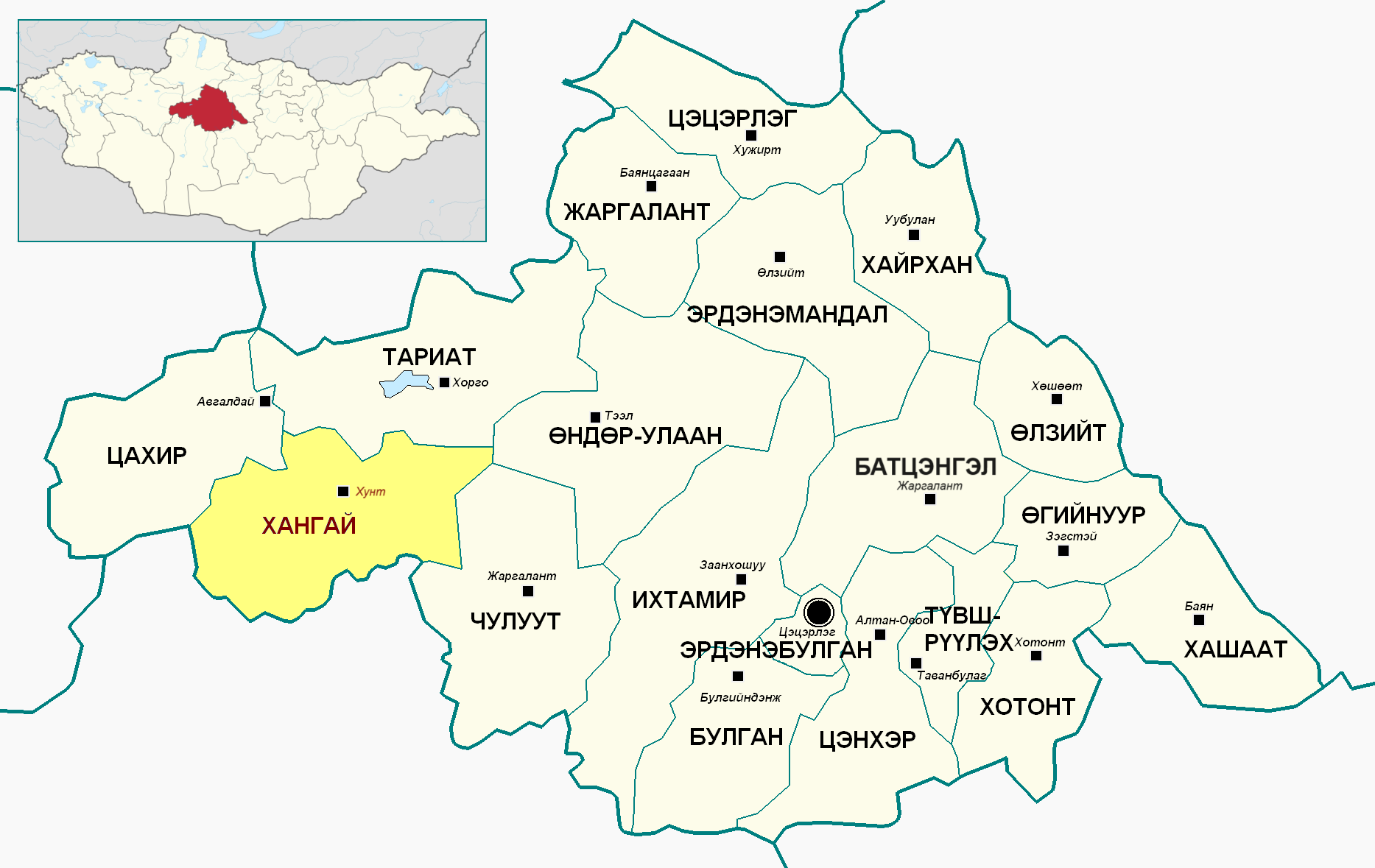
- Khangai District in Arkhangai Province
- Country: Mongolia
- Province: Arkhangai Province

Area
  - Total: 4,400 km^{2} (1,700 sq mi)
- Time zone: UTC+8 (UTC + 8)

Khangai (Mongolian: Хангай) is a sum (district) of Arkhangai Province in central Mongolia. In 2009, its population was 2,926.

The territory is dominated by the Khangai Mountain Range, and is known for its vegetation. It includes several bio-zones including mountain and mountain steppe zones, and Siberian taiga forest. Species in the area include the elk, Siberian roe deer, wolf, fox, wild boar, Siberian ibex, Eurasian lynx and brown bear. Flora in the area, includes Iris tigridia.

== Administrative divisions ==
The district is divided into six bags, which are:

- Arbayasgalan
- Bayan-Ulaan
- Chandmani
- Gichgene
- Noyon Khangai
- Terkh
