= Fritillaria yuminensis =

Scientific classification
- Kingdom: Plantae
- Clade: Tracheophytes
- Clade: Angiosperms
- Clade: Monocots
- Order: Liliales
- Family: Liliaceae
- Subfamily: Lilioideae
- Tribe: Lilieae
- Genus: Fritillaria
- Species: F. yuminensis

Binomial name
- Fritillaria yuminensis X.Z. Duan

Synonyms
- Synonymy: Fritillaria tachengensis X.Z.Duan & X.J.Zheng; Fritillaria tachengensis var. nivea Y.K.Yang & S.X.Zhang; Fritillaria yuminensis var. varians Y.K.Yang & G.J.Liu; Fritillaria yuminensis var. albiflora X.Z.Duan & X.J.Zheng; Fritillaria yuminensis var. roseoflora X.Z.Duan & X.J.Zheng

Species of flowering plant

Fritillaria yuminensis is a plant species native to the northwestern part of Xinjiang Province in northwestern China. It grows in open grassy hillsides at elevations of 1,000–3,500 m (3,300–11,500 ft).

It is a bulb-producing perennial with a purple stem up to 50 cm (20 in) tall. The flowers are pendent, nodding, bell-shaped, and either pink or blue with no markings.
