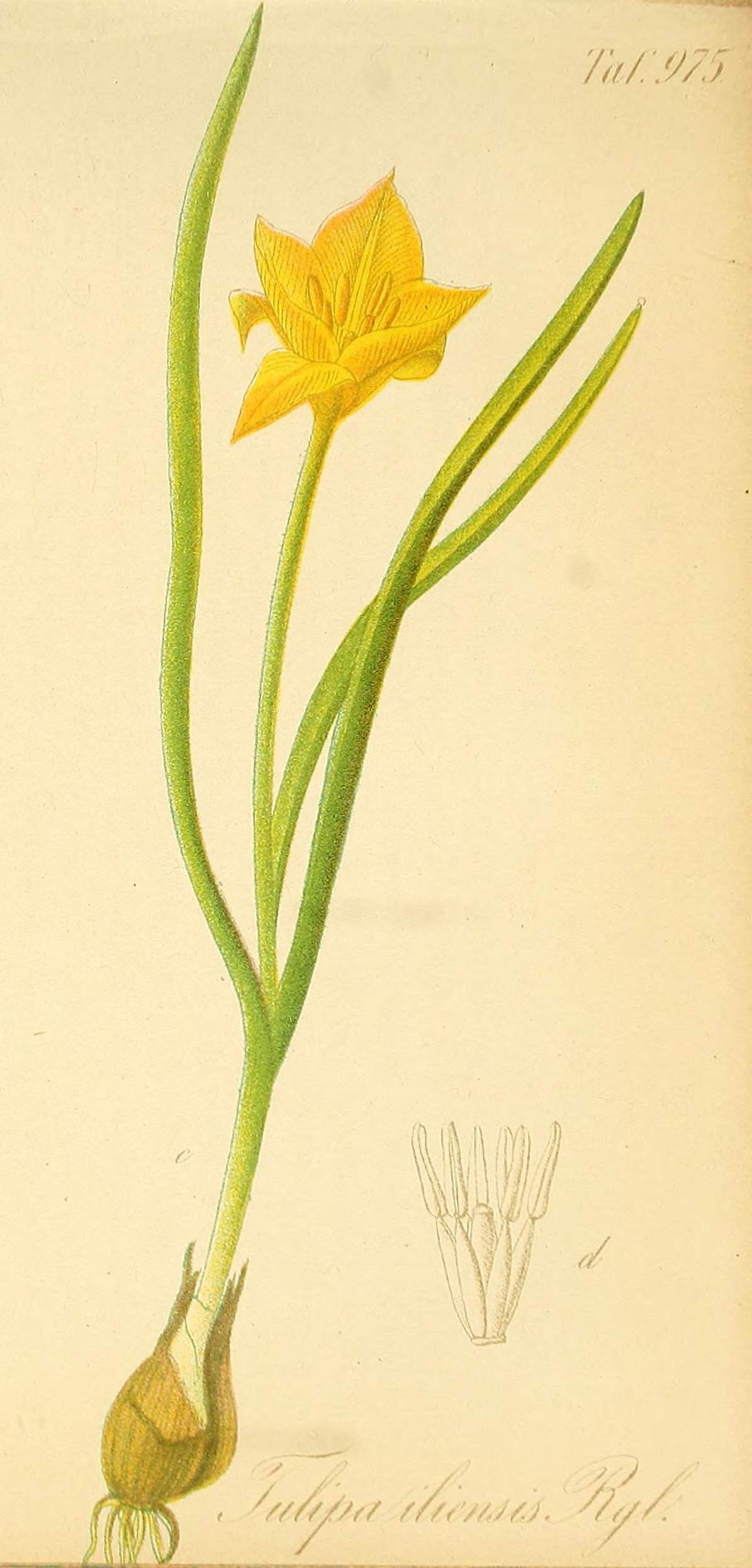
- Botanical illustration

Conservation status
- Near Threatened (IUCN 3.1)

Scientific classification
- Kingdom: Plantae
- Clade: Tracheophytes
- Clade: Angiosperms
- Clade: Monocots
- Order: Liliales
- Family: Liliaceae
- Subfamily: Lilioideae
- Tribe: Lilieae
- Genus: Tulipa
- Species: T. iliensis

Binomial name
- Tulipa iliensis Regel

Synonyms
- Tulipa thianschanica Regel; Tulipa thianschanica var. sailimuensis X.Wei & D.Y.Tan

= Tulipa iliensis =

Species of plant

Tulipa iliensis (syn. Tulipa thianschanica), the cowslip-scented tulip, is a species of flowering plant in the family Liliaceae. It is native to Kazakhstan, Kirgizstan, and Xinjiang in China. A bulbous geophyte reaching 20 cm (8 in), it is occasionally available from commercial suppliers.
