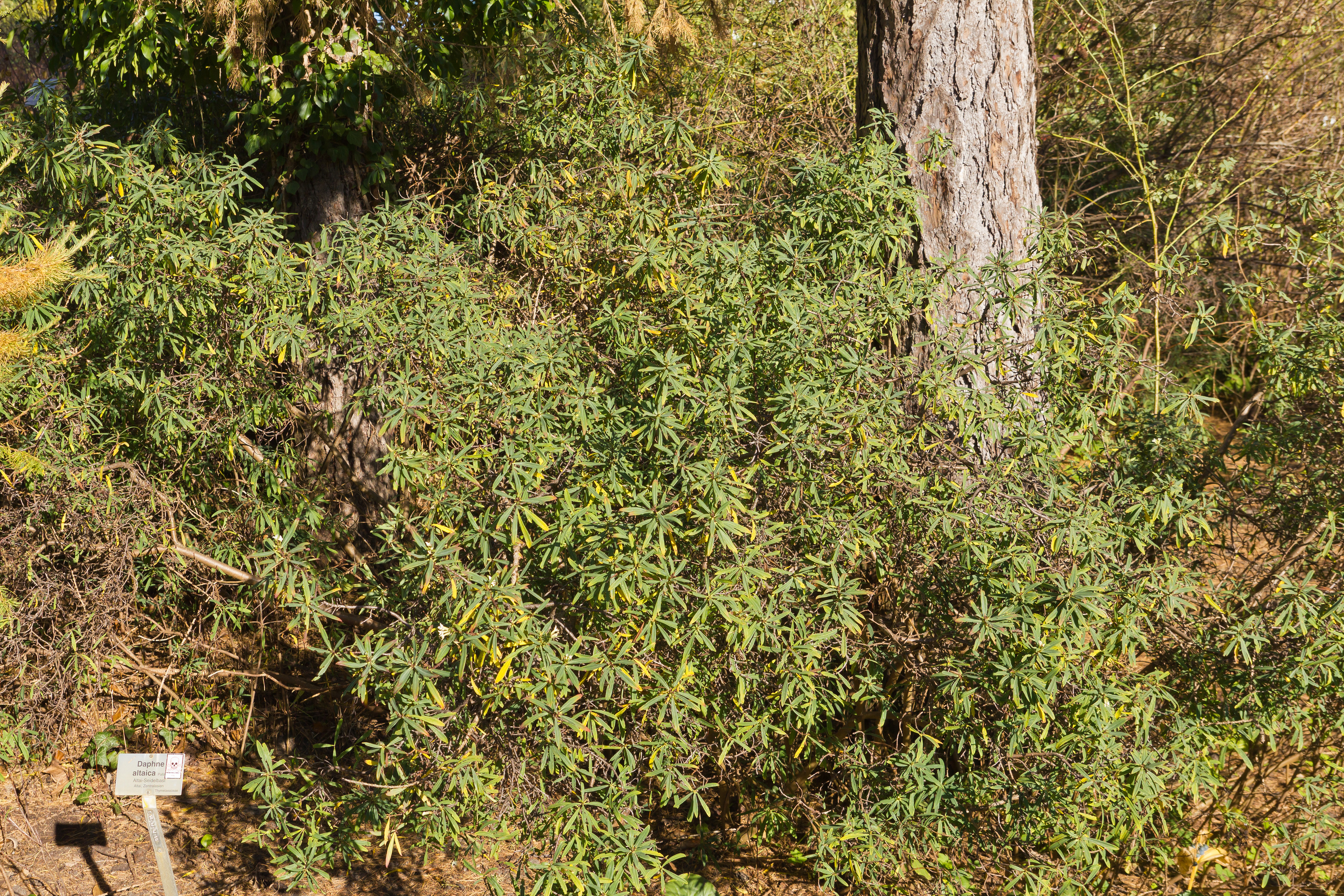
- In the Berlin Botanic Garden

Conservation status
- Data Deficient (IUCN 3.1)

Scientific classification
- Kingdom: Plantae
- Clade: Tracheophytes
- Clade: Angiosperms
- Clade: Eudicots
- Clade: Rosids
- Order: Malvales
- Family: Thymelaeaceae
- Genus: Daphne
- Species: D. altaica

Binomial name
- Daphne altaica Pall.

Synonyms
- Daphne indica Schangin; Daphne undulata Raf.; Daphne altaica f. erythrocarpa Taliev; Daphne altaica f. melanocarpa Taliev; Daphne fasciculiflora T.Z.Hsu; Daphne altaica subsp. fasciculiflora (T.Z.Hsu) Halda

= Daphne altaica =

Species of shrub

Daphne altaica is a shrub, of the family Thymelaeaceae. It is deciduous, and is found across temperate Asia, including in parts of Russia, Kazakhstan, Mongolia, and China (Xinjiang). It is found at elevations of about 1,000 m.

== Description ==
The shrub grows with an erect habit, to a height of 0.4 to 0.8 m. It flowers from May to June, and bears fruit from July to September.
