= Iris psammocola =

Scientific classification
- Kingdom: Plantae
- Clade: Tracheophytes
- Clade: Angiosperms
- Clade: Monocots
- Order: Asparagales
- Family: Iridaceae
- Genus: Iris
- Subgenus: Iris subg. Iris
- Section: Iris sect. Pseudoregelia
- Species: I. psammocola

Binomial name
- Iris psammocola Y.T.Zhao

Synonyms
- Iris potaninii var. arenaria Doronkin

Species of flowering plant

Iris psammocola is a plant species in the genus Iris, it is also in the subgenus Iris and in the section Pseudoregelia. It is a rhizomatous perennial, from China. It has grass-like leaves, short stems, yellow flowers. It is cultivated as an ornamental plant in temperate regions.

== Description ==
It has short, obconical (like an inverted cone) rhizomes, with slender secondary roots underneath. The top of the rhizome has dense straight fibres.

It has narrow, linear leaves, that can grow up to between 8–13 cm (3–5 in) long, and between 0.2 and 0.4 cm wide. They have a pointed end.

It has a very short slender stem, that can grow up to between 3–4 cm (1–2 in) tall.

The stem has 2 lanceolate and (scarious) membranous spathe (leaves of the flower bud). They are between 3.5–4 cm (1–2 in) long and about 0.8 cm wide. They have a distinct midvein.

The stems hold 1 terminal (top of stem) flower, blooming between April and May.

The yellow flowers are 4–5 cm (2–2 in) in diameter. They have a very short pedicel and slender perianth tube, that is 4–4.5 cm (2–2 in) long.

Like other irises, it has 2 pairs of petals, 3 large sepals (outer petals), known as the 'falls' and 3 inner, smaller petals (or tepals), known as the 'standards'. The falls have an obovate limb (part of the petal beside the stem), they are 4 cm (2 in) long and 1.5 cm wide. In the centre of the petal is a beard. The erect standards are oblanceolate and 3.5 cm (1 in) long and 4 cm wide.

It has 1.5 cm long stamens, and style branches that are 3.5 cm long.

After the iris has flowered, it produces a seed capsule which has not been described.

=== Biochemistry ===
As most irises are diploid, having two sets of chromosomes, this can be used to identify hybrids and classification of groupings. Nothing has been reported as of August 2015 about a chromosome count of the iris.

== Taxonomy ==
It is written as 沙生鸢尾 in Chinese script and known as sha sheng yuan wei in Pidgin.

It is commonly known in China as 'sandy iris'.

The Latin specific epithet psammocola refers to an amalgamation of two Greek words: 'psammo' – sand, and 'cola' – living in.

It was originally collected in the desert dunes of Baijiatan (White House Beach), near the city of Lingwu, in Ningxia on 10 April 1959.

It was first published and described by Yu Tang Zhao in 'Acta Phytotax. Sin.' Vol.30 Issue 2 on page 181 in 1992.

It was verified by United States Department of Agriculture and the Agricultural Research Service on 4 April 2003, then updated on 29 September 2008.

It is listed in the Encyclopedia of Life.

As of August 2015, Iris psammocola is not yet an accepted name by the RHS.

== Distribution and habitat ==
It is native to temperate Asia.

=== Range ===
It is found in China, within the province of Ningxia.

Geographic distribution: Asia – China – Ningxia Hui Ningxia Dune Region, China.

=== Habitat ===
It grows in the desert dunes.

== Toxicity ==
Like many other irises, most parts of the plant are poisonous (rhizome and leaves), if mistakenly ingested can cause stomach pains and vomiting. Also handling the plant may cause a skin irritation or an allergic reaction.

== Sources ==
- Wu Zheng-yi & P. H. Raven et al., eds. 1994–. Flora of China (English edition).
- Doronkin, V.M. & Shaulo, D.N. 2007, Iris psammocola (Iridaceae) a new species to the flora of Russia, Bot. Zhurn. 92(3): 435–439
