= Red Data Book of the Russian Federation =

Russian government document on endangered species

Red Data Book of the Russian Federation (RDBRF), also known as Red Book (Russian: Красная книга) or Russian Red Data Book, is a state document established for documenting rare and endangered species of animals, plants and fungi, as well as some local subspecies (such as the Ladoga seal) that exist within the territory of the Russian Federation and its continental shelf and marine economic zone. The book has been adopted by Russia to enact a common agreement on rare and endangered species protection.

== Conservation ==
The book provides a central information source in organizing studies and monitoring programs on rare and endangered species and their habitats.

== History ==
The first Russian Red Data Book was based upon research conducted between 1961 and 1964 by a number of Soviet biologists. It represented the Soviet part of the IUCN Red List (hence the name). At that time it was just the Soviet Union's first organized list of endangered species, not a legislative document.

In the late 1960s, more research was conducted. In 1974, the Ministry of Agriculture (Russia) adopted the first official Red Book, which was published in 1978. In 1984, the second revision was published as Red Data Book of the Russian Soviet Federative Socialist Republic (RSFSR), exclusively for animals.

The document complemented law as a list of endangered species. Animals on the list were strictly protected and their treatment regulated by Soviet law.

In 1988, the Red Data Book of the RSFSR for plants was published with 533 species of plants including 465 species of vascular plants, 22 species of bryophytes, 29 species of lichens and 17 species of fungi.

After the collapse of the Soviet Union, regulations on endangered species were instituted by each of the former Soviet countries. As of 2003, the absence of a federal regulation rendered regional Red Listing "chaotic and uncontrolled" with 37 regional Red Data Books covering 42 out of 89 Russian regions. Most of these Red Data Books did not meet federal requirements for publication as regional legal acts.

Many of them had insufficient expertise and resources to maintain their lists and enforce common regulations; therefore, a common ecological treaty was made with mutual recognition of endangered species.

== Cross-referencing ==
Animals, plants and fungi listed in the IUCN-The World Conservation Union list of endangered species and inhabiting Russian territory, including the continental shelf and marine economic zone (whether permanently or temporarily) may be included to the RDBRF if this is necessary due to their number or status in Russia. The same is true for species protected by international conventions such as CITES.

== Legal framework ==
As of 2003, the legal framework for species conservation on the federal level consisted of the Constitution of the Russian Federation of 1993, the Law on the Animal World from May 5, 1995 and the Law on the Protection of the Environment of 2002.

The species listed in the RDBRF must be listed in the regional red data books of the Russian Federation subjects.

At the moment, the Russian Federation uses the 1998 edition of the RDBRF. A federal Red Data Book is complemented and expanded by regional Red Data Books that govern hunting within particular region, although instituting of regional Red Data Books is not compulsory. Regional CIS Red Data Books are direct descendants of their counterparts in the former USSR which were established in individual SSRs and in certain special areas. Even municipal-level territories at times issue their own Red Data Books.

Usually, a Red Book comes with a short description of protected species. However, in certain cases, it does not give all descriptions due to space limitations and in rare cases there is no formatted list in the book.

All of the CIS states currently implement Red Data Books.

== Criticism of regional policies ==
Introduction of regional Red Books sometimes provokes negative reaction, up to "Red book Bacchanalia". It is alleged that funds which could have been used on more proactive ecological activities are being squandered on useless paperwork, since the federal RDBRF already fulfills all the requirements of such documents. In addition, allegations are made that local illegal animal traffickers use regional Red Books to track down endangered species.

Proponents of Red Books usually give the following reasons: the connection between illegal hunting and Red Books is unclear and not proven. Local biologists can be approached and bribed by illegal entrepreneurs with the same ease. Funds that are used to create these books do support local biological research. Additionally, regional Red Books allow for more accurate and diverse local environmental protection, like greater bird protection in cities and flora protection in Arctic regions.

== Red Data Book categories and their explanations ==
Category		Meaning
Index	Title	Meaning
0	Probably extinct	Taxa and populations that inhabited Russian territory (or marine area) in the past and whose presence has been not confirmed in 50 years.
1	Endangered	Taxa and populations whose abundance has decreased down to critical levels so that they can become extinct in the near future.
2	Decreasing Number	Taxa and populations whose number is constantly decreasing. If the negative factors reducing the number continue, the taxa can be moved to Category 1 in the near future.
3	Rare	Taxa and populations a low number of individuals inhabiting a limited territory (or a marine area) or sporadically distributed over an extensive territory (or marine area).
4	Uncertain Status	Taxa and populations which apparently belong to one of the above categories but there are considerable gaps in knowledge on them or they do not exactly meet the criteria for the other categories.
5	Rehabilitated and Rehabilitating	Taxa and populations whose number and distribution is recovered or recovering due to protective measures. They are close to the state of stable existence without any urgent measures on protection and rehabilitation.

== See also ==
- IUCN Red List
- Regional Red List
