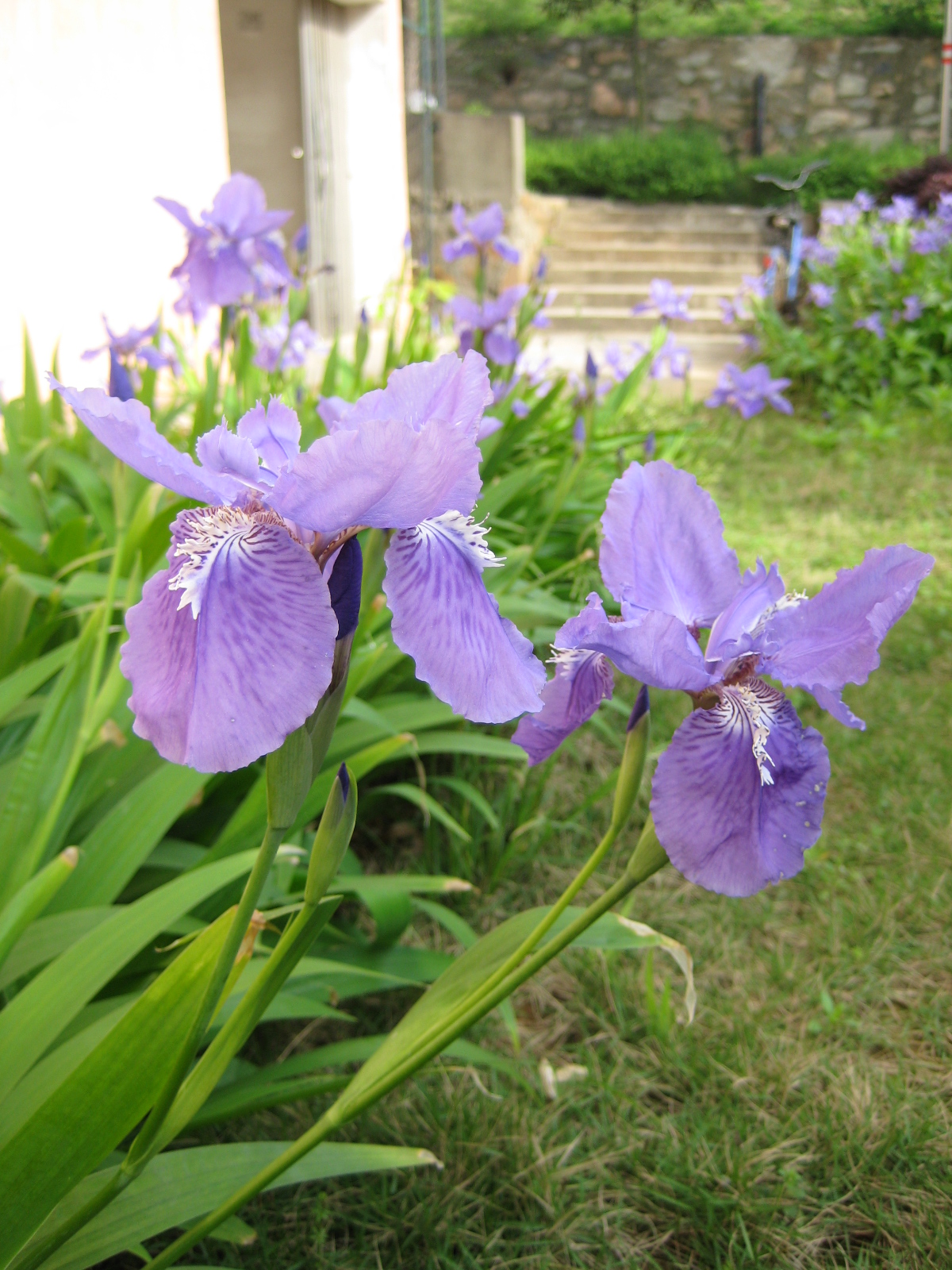
- Wall iris (Iris tectorum)

Scientific classification
- Kingdom: Plantae
- Clade: Tracheophytes
- Clade: Angiosperms
- Clade: Monocots
- Order: Asparagales
- Family: Iridaceae
- Genus: Iris
- Subgenus: Iris subg. Limniris
- Section: Iris sect. Lophiris
- Species: I. tectorum

Binomial name
- Iris tectorum Maxim.

Synonyms
- Evansia tectorum (Maxim.) Klatt; Iris chinensis Bunge [Illegitimate]; Iris rosthornii Diels; Iris tectorum f. alba (Dykes) Makino; Iris tectorum var. alba Dykes; Iris tectorum f. tectorum (none known); Iris tomiolopha Hance

= Iris tectorum =

Species of flowering plant

Iris tectorum (also known as roof iris, Japanese roof iris and wall iris) is a plant species in the genus Iris, it is also in the subgenus Limniris. It is a rhizomatous perennial. It is native of China, Korea and Burma, with lavender-blue, bluish-violet, purple-blue, blue-lilac or sky blue flowers. There is a white form as well. It is a compact plant and is cultivated as an ornamental plant in temperate regions of the world.

== Description ==
It has a thick, (the size of a man's thumb), creeping, buff (coloured), or greenish rhizome. They are similar in form to a bearded iris rhizome. It has slender, short roots (under the rhizomes), and fibres on the top. The creeping habit, creates spreading clumps of plants. It does not produce stolons.

It has basal fans, that are yellowish green, or pale green, and sword-shaped (ensiform), or lance-shaped. They are also, glossy, and ribbed, and can grow up to between 15–60 cm (6–24 in) long and 1.5–5 cm (1–2 in) wide. The leaves are floppy, and described as semi-evergreen.

It has terete (cylindrical), stems that can grow up to between 20–45 cm (8–18 in) tall. It has 1–2 branches, and 1–2 (reduced) stem leaves.

The stems have 2–3 spathes (leaves of the flower bud), that are green, lanceolate and 3.5–7.5 cm (1–3 in) long and 2–2.5 cm (1–1 in) wide.

It has a 1 cm long pedicel (flower stalk), which is shorter than the spathe, but similar in size to the ovary.

The stems (and the branches) hold between 1 and 3 flowers, in late spring, or early summer, between April and May, or June. It flowers between September and October in Australia. The flower display can last for 2 weeks. The flowers are 7.6–10 cm (3–4 in) in diameter, The flattened, horizontal, flowers are larger than Iris japonica flowers.

The flowers come in shades of lavender blue, or bluish violet, or blue-lilac, or purple-blue, or sky blue. There is also a white form.

It has 2 pairs of petals, 3 large sepals (outer petals), known as the 'falls' and 3 inner, smaller petals (or tepals), known as the 'standards'. The falls are obovate (egg-like), or ovate, with darker (or brownish purple/violet). mottling, veining, streaks, or spots, around a toothed or lacinated (fringed), white crest. They have a bi-coloured claw (part of the petal closest to the stem), white and violet or lilac. The falls are 5–7 cm (2–3 in) long and 4 cm wide. The elliptic standards spread horizontally (not erect), and are 4.5–5 cm (2–2 in) long and 3 cm wide. Both petals (falls and standards) can have wavy margins.

The flowers are self-fertile, but are pollinated by insects.

It has a 2.5–3 cm long slender, perianth tube, a 2.5 cm long stamen, bright yellow anthers and a cylindric, 1.8–2 cm long ovary. It has a pale bluish-violet style branch, that is 3.5 cm long. It has toothed lobes (at the tips), that are irregular.

After the iris has flowered, between June and August, it produces an ellipsoid or obovoid (oblong-ovoid), light green, seed capsule. It is 4.5–6 cm (2–2 in) long and 2–2.5 cm wide, and has 6 ribs. When it ripens, (and goes brown,) it splits in three, along 2 or more seams, starting from the top. Inside, are multiple, black-brown seeds, which are pyriform (pear shaped) and have a small cream (coloured) aril (appendage).

=== Biochemistry ===
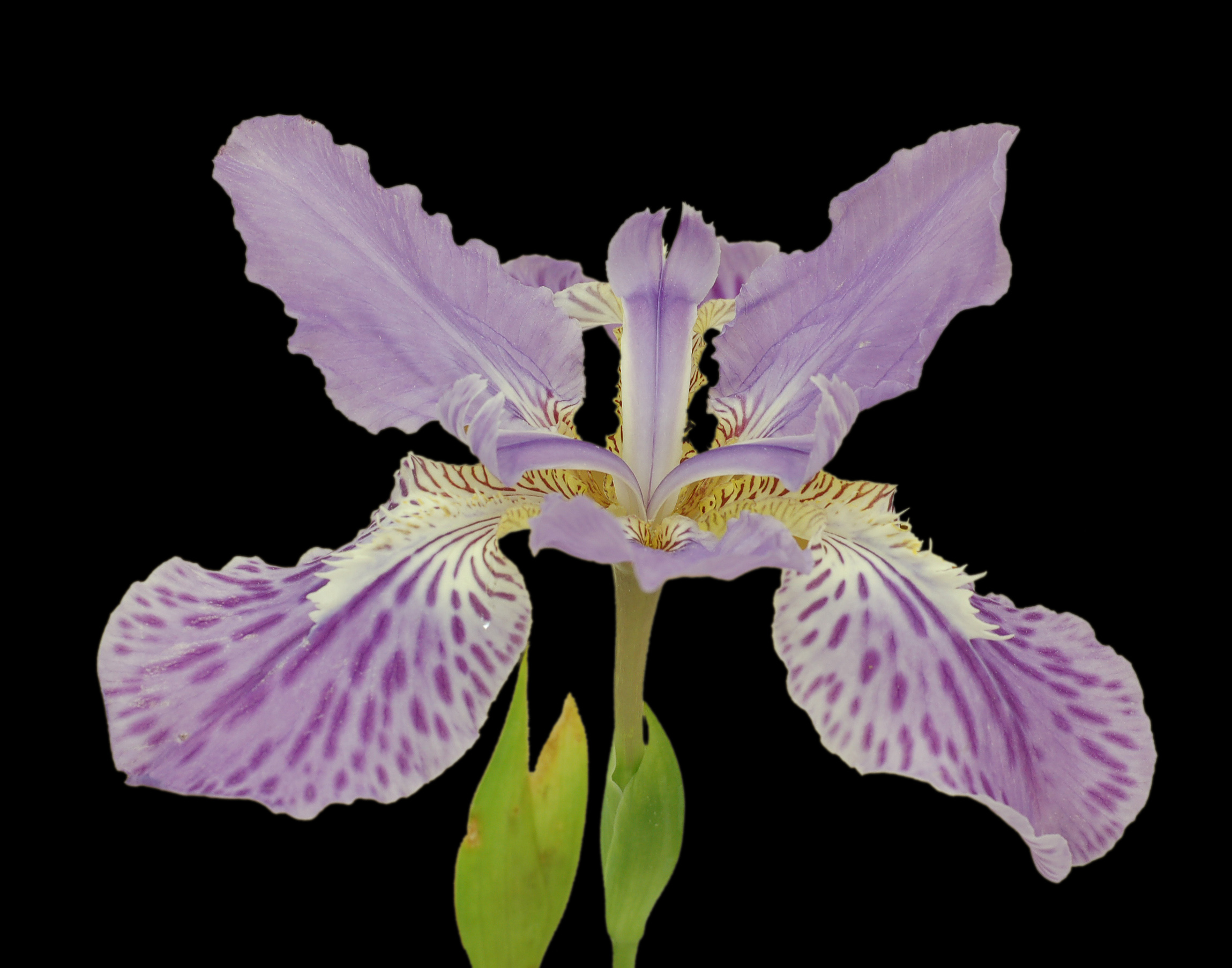
Iris tectorum, seen in the Tyler Arboretum

In 1994, a study was carried out to isolate various chemical compounds from the seeds of Iris tectorum, it found an ester 'iristectorene B'.

In 1999, a study was carried out Iris tectorum rhizomes, it found a triterpenoid chemical compound.

In 2007, a study was carried out on cytotoxic properties of Iris tectorum, used to treat cancer.

In May 2007, a study was carried out on the rhizomes of Iris tectorum, to find various chemical compounds.

In 2009, a karyotype analysis was carried out on 10 Irises found in China, and found that Iris tectorums was 2n=28.

In 2011, Isoflavones such as tectoridin, iristectorin B and iristectorin A have been found in the rhizomes of Iris tectorum. They were published in the Journal of Chromatography B, Vol. 879, Issue 13, pages 975–980.

In 2012, a study was carried out on the leaves of Iris tectorum for anti cancer properties.

In 2013, a study was carried on Iris tectorum to isolate various chemical compounds.

In 2013, a molecular phylogenetic (genetic evolution) study was carried out on 16 species of Iris found in Korea. It placed Iris mandshurica in a clade with other basal irises, including Iris dichotoma and Iris tectorum.

In January 2014, a study was carried out on the neuro-protective activities of Iris tectorum.

Several isoflavones have been found in Iris tectorum. Iris tectorigenin A is found in Iris florentina, Iris tectorum, Iris pseudacorus, Iris kumaonensis and Belamcanda chinensis (iris domestica). Iristectorin B (C_{23}H_{24}O_{12}) can be found in the rhizomes of Iris tectorum, iris-tectorigenin B found in Iris germanica and Iris tectorum and iristectorin A (which is also found in Belamcanda chinensis).

=== Cytology ===
As most irises are diploid, having two sets of chromosomes, this can be used to identify hybrids and classification of groupings. Diploid counts include 2n=28, Simonet, 1932; 2n=32, Sharma, 1970; 2n=28, Chimphamba, 1973; 2n=28, Karihaloo, 1978; 2n=28, Karihaloo, 1984; 2n=28, Huiang, 1986; 2n=36, Mao & Xue, 1986; 2n=28, Huang 1989; and 2n=32, Dong et al., 1994. It is normally designated as 2 n = 24, 28, 32.

=== Taxonomy ===
It is pronounced as (Iris) EYE-ris (tectorum) tek-TOR-um.

It is written as 鸢尾 in Chinese script, and known as yuan wei in Pidgin in China.

It has several common names, including; roof iris, Japanese roof iris, wall iris (in America), wall flag, white root iris, Ichihatu (In Japan – meaning first as the first iris to flower), shenan, and roof garden iris.

It is known as Dach-Schwertlilie in German and takiris in Swedish.

The Latin specific epithet tectorum refers to Latin word for roof or covering.

Iris tectorum is native to China, but was first discovered in the 1860s, growing in Japan on the roofs, hence the common name.

It was first published and described by Karl Maximovich in the 'Bulletin of Acad. Imp. Sci. Saint-Pétersbourg' Volume15 page380 in 1871.

It was published in Flor. Serres Vol.22 page 23 in 1874, with a colour illustration, then published by Hooker in Curtis's Botanical Magazine table 6118 in September, 1874, and in the 'Journal of the Royal Horticultural Society' Vol88 page116 in 1963.

It was introduced to England and European cultivation in 1874, by Philipp Franz von Siebold, who sent plants to St Petersburg. It was also introduced to US cultivation by Mr William Bull in 1874.

It was verified by United States Department of Agriculture and the Agricultural Research Service on 2 April 1996 and updated on 1 December 2004.

Iris tectorum is an accepted name by the RHS.

== Distribution and habitat ==
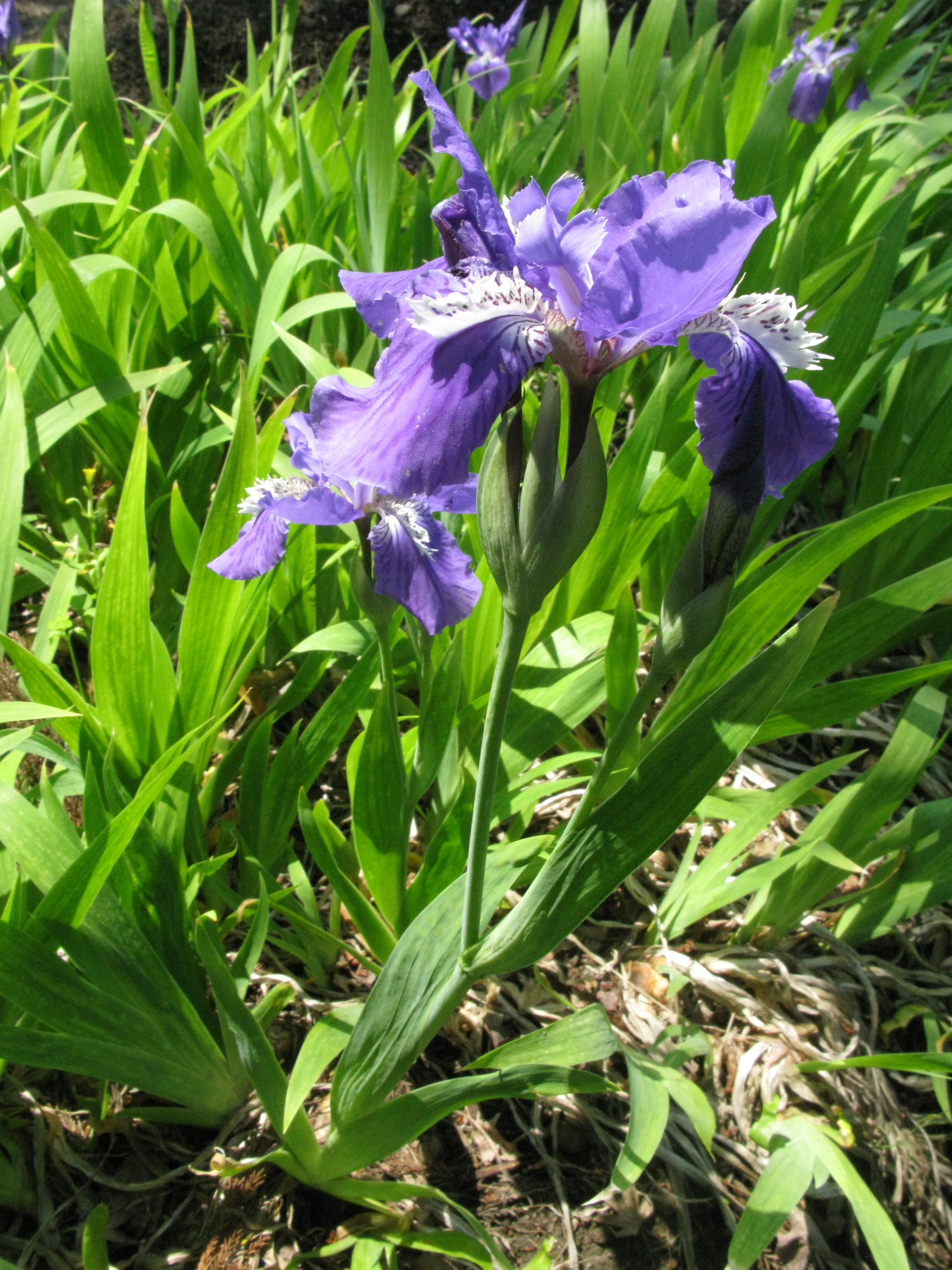
Iris tectorum from Aizu Matsudaira's Royal Garden, Fukushima pref., Japan

It is native to temperate and tropical regions of Asia.

=== Range ===
It is found in (central and south western), China, within the Chinese provinces, of Anhui, Fujian, Gansu, Guangdong, Guangxi, Guizhou, Hainan, Hubei, Hunan, Jiangsu, Jiangxi, Shaanxi, Shanxi, Sichuan, Xizang, Yunnan and Zhejiang.

Also found in Korea, and within (the tropical region) of Myanmar (Burma).

It is often cited as native to Japan, but it may just be naturalized.

It has naturalized in Bhutan and India. It has also naturalized in regions of America, including New Hampshire.

=== Habitat ===
It grows on forest margins, on sunny banks, in meadows, in damp places and beside water. It can also be found growing along roadsides and on steep hillsides, in China.

They can be found at an altitude of 500–3,500 m (1,600–11,500 ft) above sea level.

In New Hampshire, as a wild flower, it is found on the edges of lawns and fields, beside roadsides and in compost heaps.

== Cultivation ==
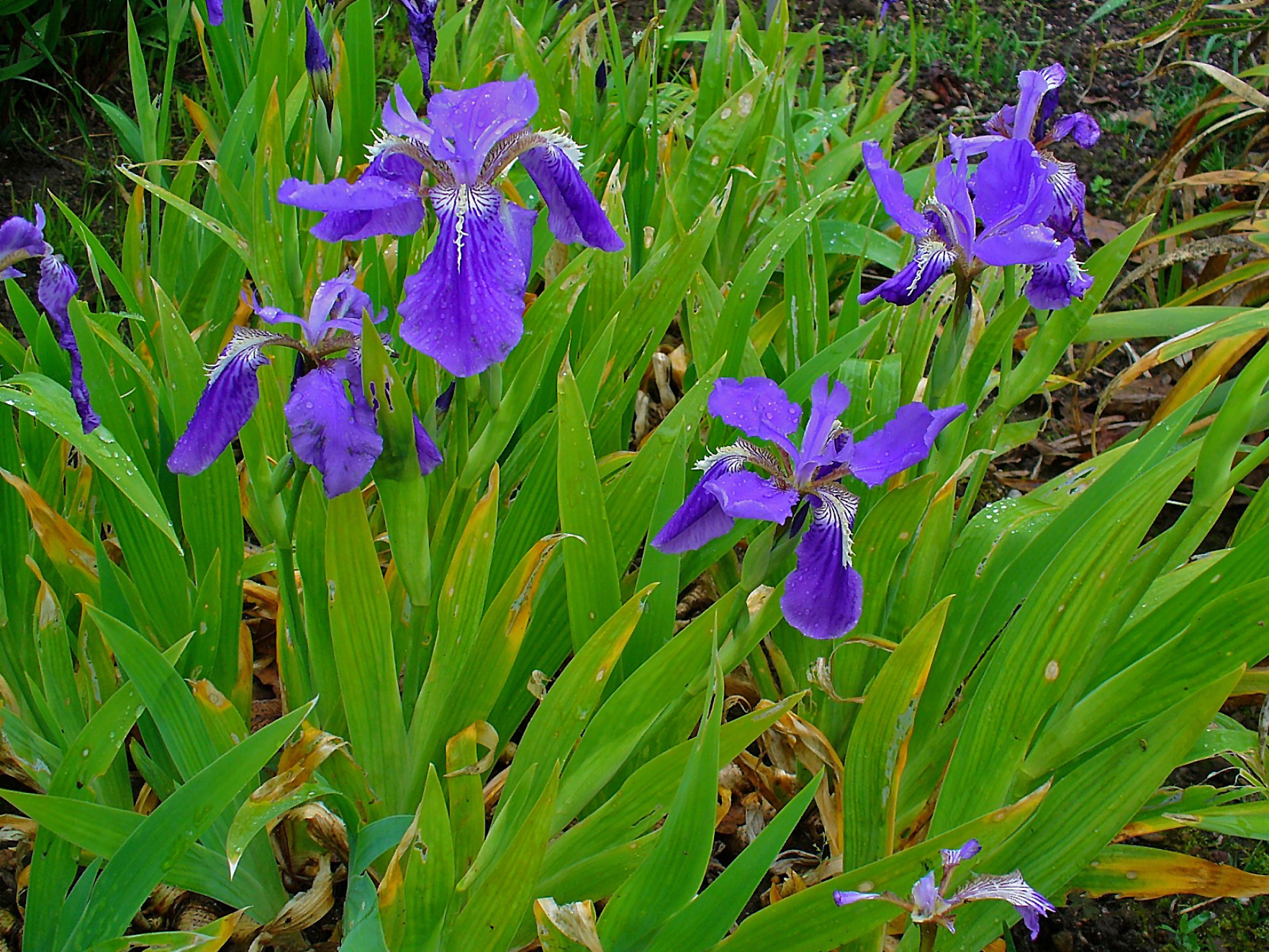
Iris tectorum from the Botanical Garden of the KIT, Karlsruhe, Germany

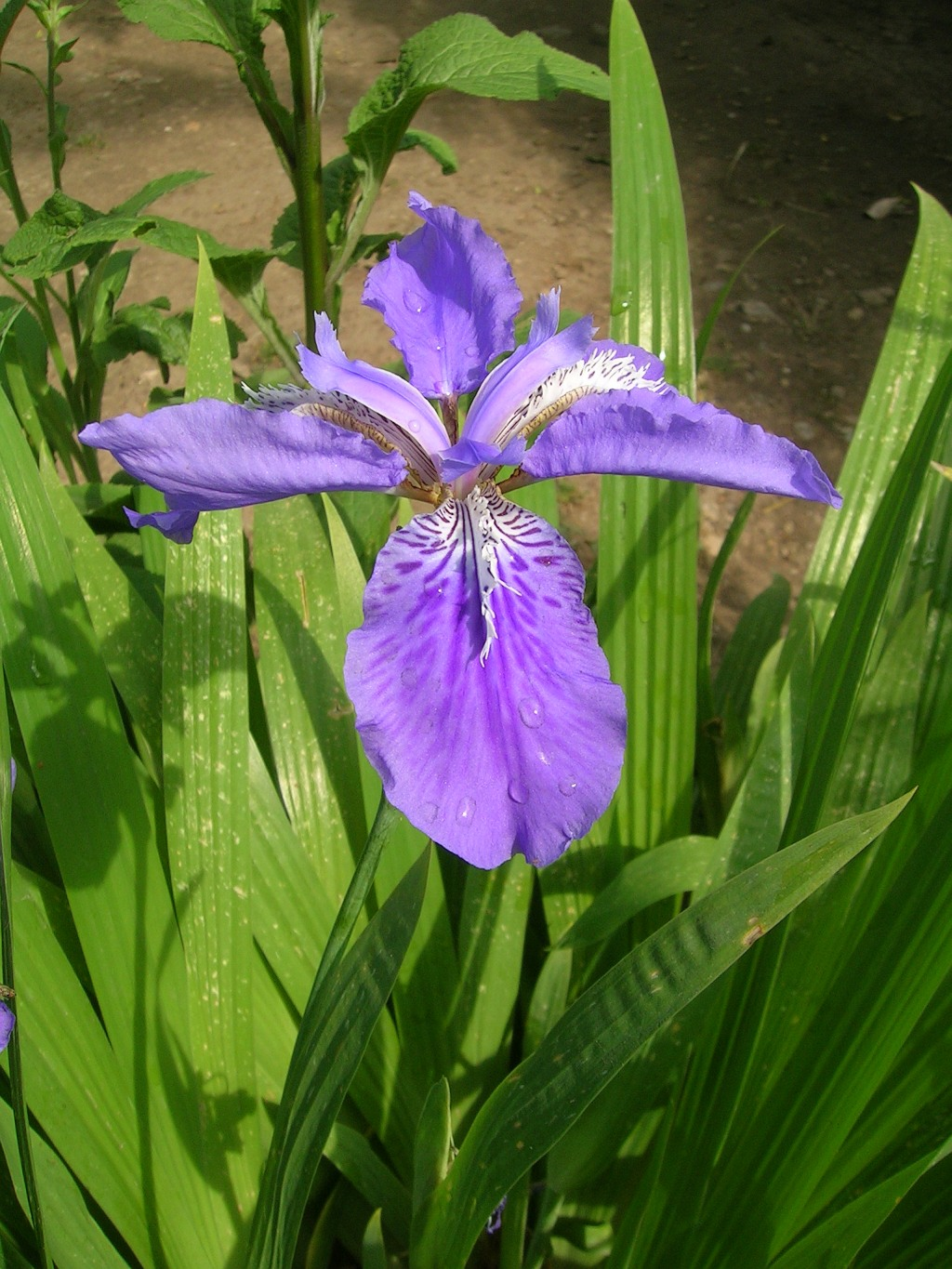
Iris tectorum from Munsiyari, India

The cultivation of Iris tectorum is very similar to that of Iris japonica and Iris milesii.

It is hardy to between USDA Zone 4 and Zone 9. It is hardy to European Zone H2, meaning it can tolerate temperatures as low as −10, but needs protection from hard frosts. Older plants can survive some frosts but young plants need protection in the spring. Both the blue and white forms of the iris, are perfectly hardy. It is hardy in the UK, but it does not flower very well, due to the summers not being hot enough to bake the roots. After flowering, it is best to remove the old stems from Iris confusa, Iris japonica and Iris tectorum, as this helps the plant survive the winter.

It prefers to grow in humus, rich, moist soil, with good drainage.

During spring or autumn, a top dressing of well rotted compost (or well rotted manure), should be added, a feed of fertilizer can also be added. A mulch can also be applied (at the same time) to retain the moisture.

It can tolerate neutral or acidic soils (pH levels between 6.1 – 7.8).

It can tolerate positions between full sun and partial shade, but prefers light shade, In full sun, the leaves can bleach. (similar to woodland conditions). Although, a few sources say it prefers a sunny, sheltered site.

It has average water needs during the growing season. If the summer conditions become exceedingly hot and dry, the iris will go into early dormancy. Therefore it prefers a dry and cold winter, with a warm and wet summer.

It can be grown in a mixed flower border, rock garden, and in a woodland garden. If the plant is to be grown in a rockery, it is recommended that the plant has new soil or fertiliser every year. It can be also grown in containers and large (15 cm) pots, but it needs to be re-potted frequently. In the UK, the pot can survive the winter in a cold greenhouse.

It suffers from a virus disease that causes leaf discolouration, yellowing and streaking. It seems immune to insect pests, but can be prone to damage from slugs or snails. Also an aphid, Aulacorthum solani can be found on the plant.

Since the roots can quickly take all the nutrients out of the soil, division and re-planting is needed every other year, or every 3–5 years when clumps become over-crowded. Although, it can be left undisturbed for many years, but flowering will decrease.

Like most rhizomatous irises, it should be planted with the top of rhizome just at the surface of the soil. They should be spaced 20–30 cm (8–12 in) apart.

=== Propagation ===
Iris tectorum can be propagated by division or by seed growing. It is easy to raise from seed.

Plants grown from its seeds will re-produce a true form, including white plants.

Division is best done in the spring, or fall (after flowering). Transplanting should be carried out soon after division.

=== Hybrids and cultivars ===
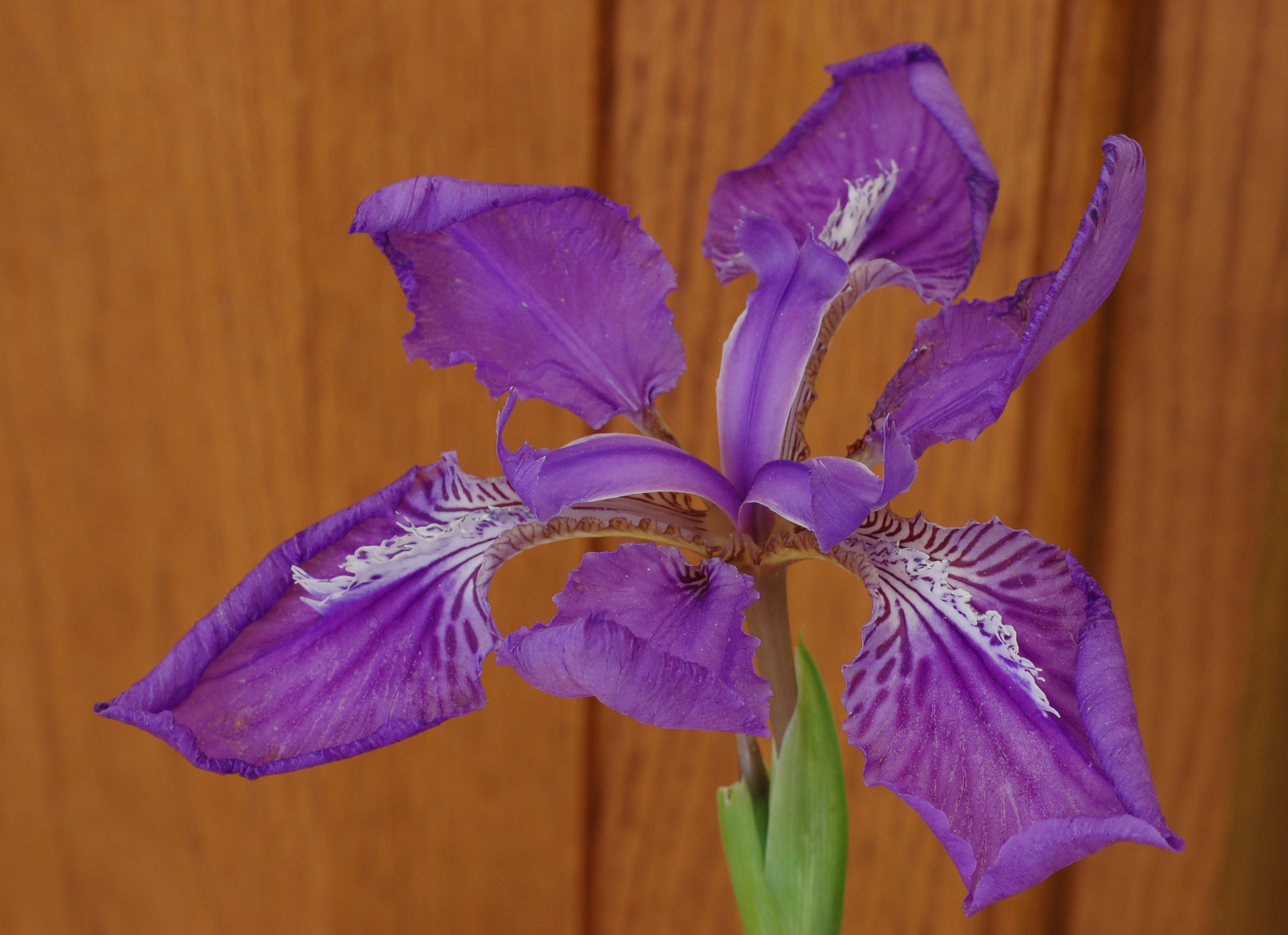
Iris tectorum 'Woolong'

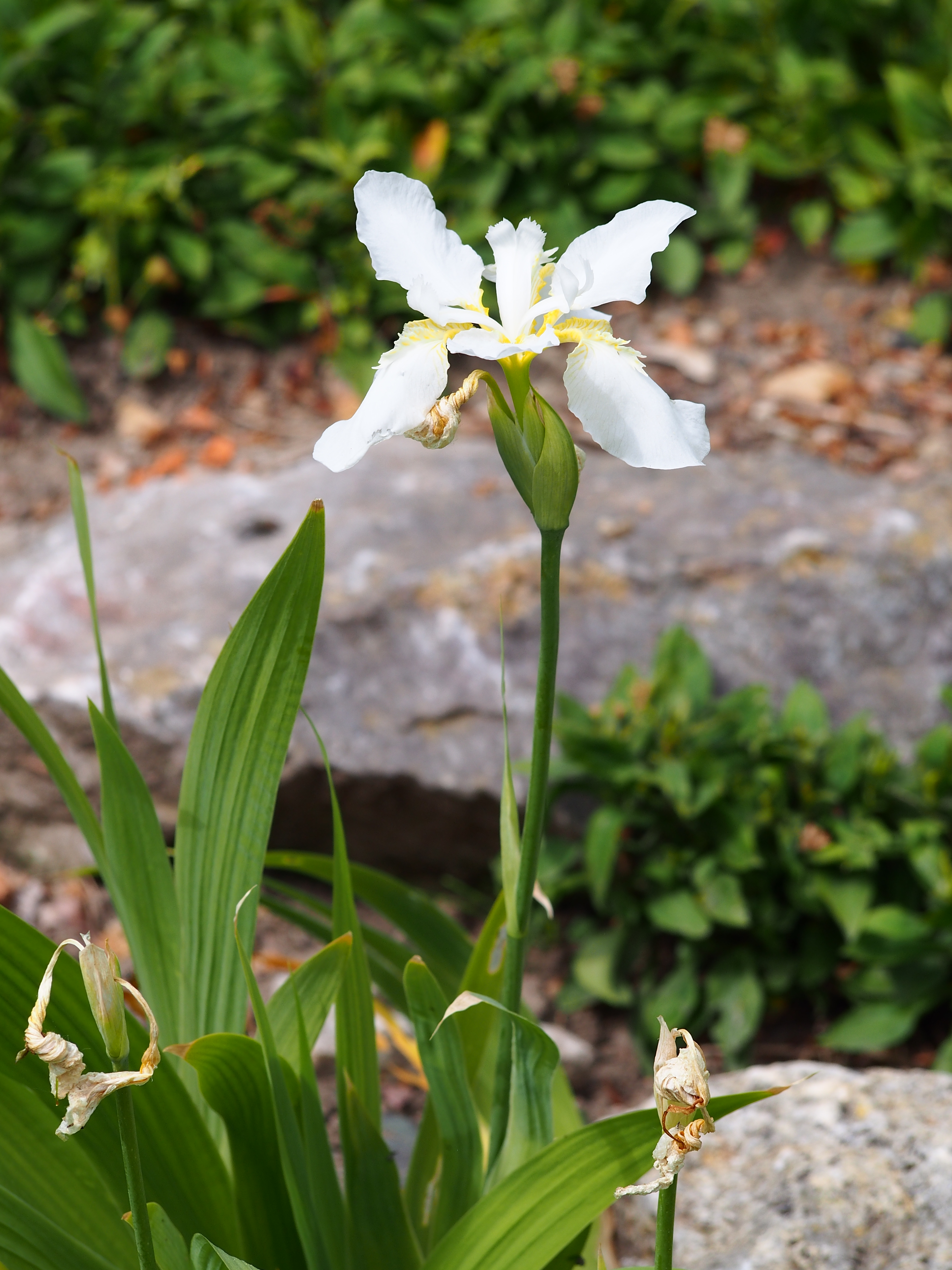
Iris tectorum 'Alba'

Iris tectorum has many cultivars including;

- 'Alba' (Dykes, has white flowers with yellow markings, yellow veins, and 30 cm tall,),
- 'Adamgrove Strain',
- 'Atrocaeruleum',
- 'Burma Form' (from Australia, mid-green leaves, height 40 cm. blooms in May, dark violet flowers flecked and veined with purple, and has white crests),
- 'Freckletec',
- 'Japan Form',
- 'Lilacina',
- 'Middleton Blue',
- 'Moon Gold',
- 'Norris Strain',
- 'Oliver Twist',
- 'Taiwan Form',
- 'Tectorum Alba',
- 'Tectorum album semi plenum',
- 'Tectorum Sir Arthur Hort's variety,
- 'Tetratec', 'Variegated tectorum',
- 'Variegata' (foliage is striped and streaked creamy-white, with purple flowers,),
- 'Wolong' (from Wolong in Sichuan, blooms mid-April, 20inches tall, lavender flowers with small dark purple flecks,).

== Toxicity ==
Like many other irises, most parts of the plant are poisonous (rhizome and leaves), if mistakenly ingested, it can cause stomach pains and vomiting. Also handling the plant may cause a skin irritation (like dermatitis or an allergic reaction.

== Uses ==
Despite its toxicity, it is used in Chinese herbal medicine to treat hepatitis and wind damp pains.

The Kam eat fish that have been given fresh Iris tectorum, as medicine to treat stomach aches.

== Culture ==
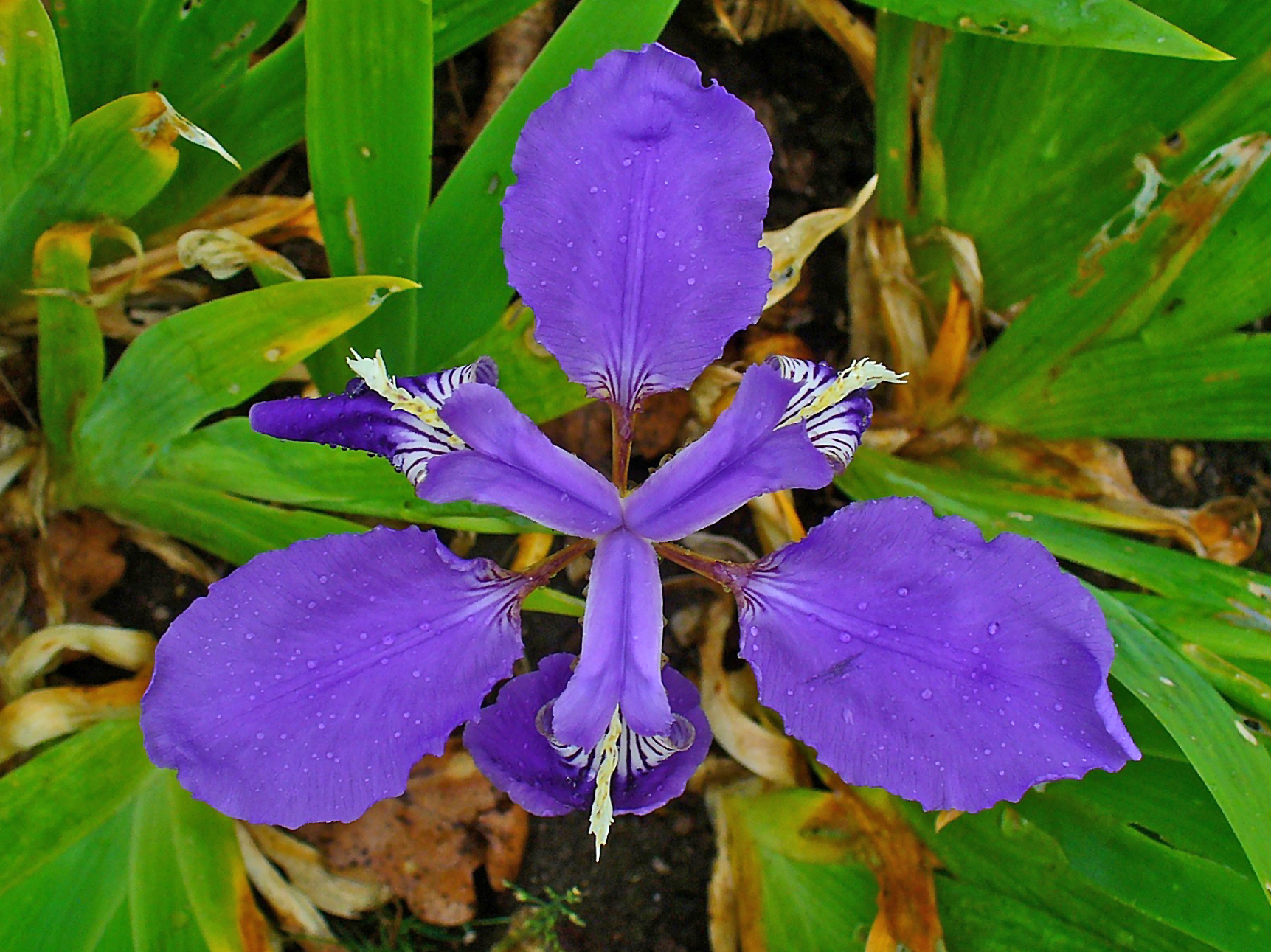
Flower of Iris tectorum

Iris tectorum is commonly called the 'roof iris' because it was grown in the thatch of Chinese and Japanese houses. There are several theories as to why;

The most common theory, was due to a period of wartime, or great famine in Japan, all land was then decreed by the emperor to be cultivated, for rice and other food crops. Also, it was illegal for land to be used for growing flowers. But also women wanted the iris roots for making hair dye, face powder and corn plasters. The rhizomes were ground down, to make a white powder used for whitening the skin, similar in look to Geisha girls. Although, EA bowles did not believe this theory.

Another theory was that it was grown in the wet clay and was used to bind the straw thatch together, to stop a roof coming apart. It also acted as a decoration, creating a purple flowering roof-ridge.

A final reason known was that it was planted to avert the 'evil spirits' and a superstition that they prevent disease from affecting the householders.

== See also ==
- Iris (plant)

== Sources ==
- Aldén, B., S. Ryman & M. Hjertson. 2009. Våra kulturväxters namn – ursprung och användning. Formas, Stockholm (Handbook on Swedish cultivated and utility plants, their names and origin).
- Chinese Academy of Sciences. 1959–. Flora reipublicae popularis sinicae.
- Dykes, 1913, The Genus Iris
- Erhardt, W. et al. 2008. Der große Zander: Enzyklopädie der Pflanzennamen.
- Huxley, A., ed. 1992. The new Royal Horticultural Society dictionary of gardening.
- Liberty Hyde Bailey Hortorium. 1976. Hortus third.
- Mathew, B. 1981. The Iris. 76–77.
- Qie et al. 1995. Natural Medicines. 49:373–382.
- Waddick, J. W. & Zhao Yu-tang. 1992. Iris of China.
