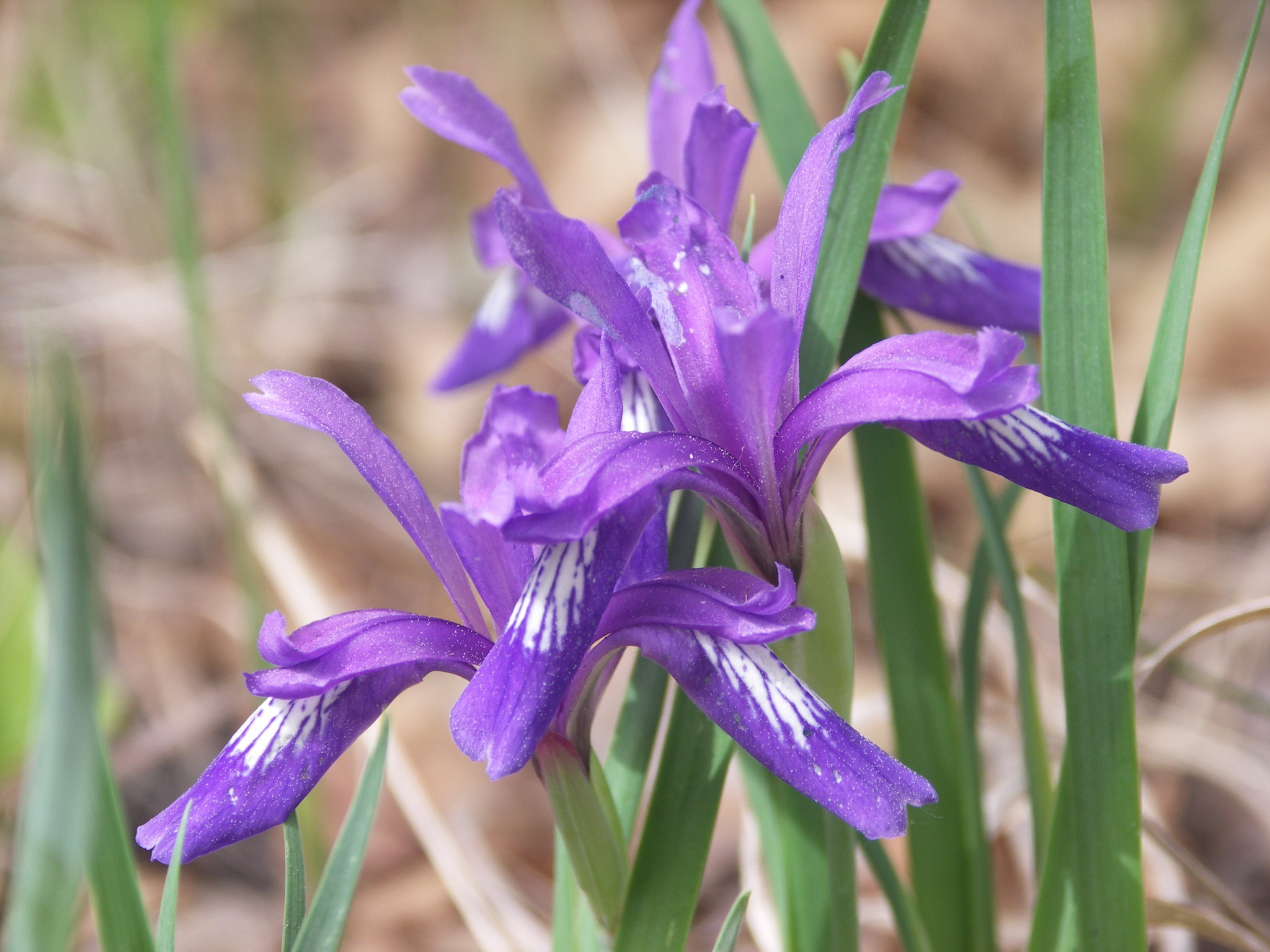

Scientific classification
- Kingdom: Plantae
- Clade: Embryophytes
- Clade: Tracheophytes
- Clade: Spermatophytes
- Clade: Angiosperms
- Clade: Monocots
- Order: Asparagales
- Family: Iridaceae
- Genus: Iris
- Subgenus: Iris subg. Limniris
- Section: Iris sect. Limniris
- Series: Iris ser. Ruthenicae
- Species: I. uniflora

Binomial name
- Iris uniflora Pall. ex Link

Synonyms
- Iris ruthenica var. uniflora (Pall. ex Link) Baker; Iris uniflora f. caricina (Kitag.) P.Y.Fu & Y.A.Chen; Iris uniflora var. caricina Kitag.; Iris uniflora var. uniflora (unknown); Limniris uniflora (Pall. ex Link) Rodion.

= Iris uniflora =

Species of flowering plant

Iris uniflora is a species in the genus Iris and in the subgenus Limniris. It is a rhizomatous perennial, from Russia, Mongolia, China and Korea. It has thin grass-like leaves and stems, and purple, blue-purple or violet flowers. It is cultivated as an ornamental plant in temperate regions.

== Description ==
Iris uniflora differs from Iris ruthenica by having thick resilient bracts (leaf on flower stem, where a flower emerges) that remain green (or yellow-green), until the seeds mature. On Iris ruthenica, the bracts usually dry out and die, after flowering.

It has a thin creeping rhizome that is brown and branched. The rhizome is covered with the remains of last years leaves. It also has fibrous roots.

It has slender flowering stems that grow up to 15 cm long. They are occasionally branched.

It has thin grass-like leaves (linear and lanceolate). The 2–3 leaves are green and grow up from the base of the plant, measuring 10–40 cm long, 5–10 mm wide. The leaves later grow longer than the flowers stems after the blooming period.

It blooms between May and June. It normally has one flower but occasionally has two flowers, which have a violet-like fragrance. It has perianth tube (that measures about) 1.5 cm.

The flowers come in shades of purple, from blue-purple to violet. They are 4–4.5 cm in diameter. They have a white veined or striped signal (at the base of the fall of the flower).

It has 1.5 cm long stamens and 5 mm long ovary.

Between July and August, it fruits (after the blooming period is over).

It has oval/globose seed capsules (measuring 8–10 mm in diameter). Which differ from other irises by being un-ribbed. Inside the capsule are round, black seeds that have a small fleshy appendage.

=== Biochemistry ===
As most irises are diploid, having two sets of chromosomes. This can be used to identify hybrids and classification of groupings. It has been examined several times to find its chromosome count: 2n=48, Scolovskaya; 2n=42, Doronkin 1984; 2n=16, Sok & Prob. 1986; 2n=42, Zakharjeva, 1990.

In 1986, a study was carried out on 3 iris species in China, the chromosomes of Iris mandshurica, Iris uniflora and Iris bloudowii were counted. It was counted as 2n = 40.

== Taxonomy ==
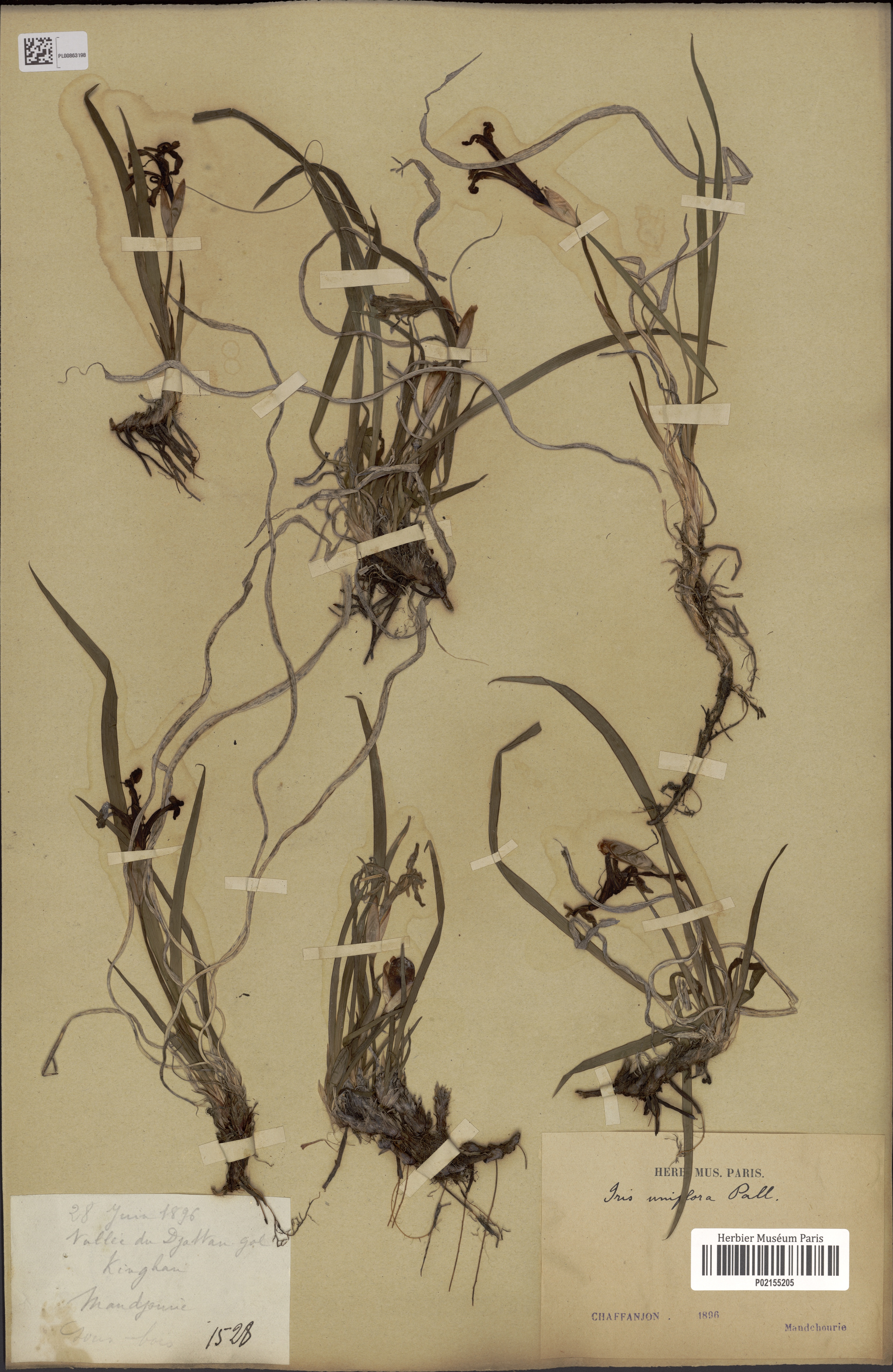
Dried specimen from Muséum National d'Histoire Naturelle, Paris

It is written as 单花鸢尾 in Chinese script and 'dan hua yuan wei' in China. It has the common name of 'rock kris' in Tibet and the Tibetan name of 'Yuki Ozawa'.

It is also known as 'single-flowered iris' in Russia.

It was first widely published by Peter Simon Pallas in 'Jahrbücher der Gewächskunde' (published in Berlin and Leipzig) in 1820. It was first found and named by Link, but he did not publish it widely.

It was illustrated later in The Garden magazine page 187 on 5 September 1896.

In 1892, it was thought to be a variety of Iris ruthenica (Iris ruthenica var. uniflora) by Baker (in his book, Handbook Irid. 4. 1892). which he noted was "a form with narrow leaves (2—6 mm wide at anthesis, ca. 10 mm wide in fruit". It was described as Iris uniflora var. caricina by Kitagawa in the Botanical Magazine (of Tokyo) in 1935, which is still considered a variant by the American Iris Society. In 1981, Brian Mathew notes in his book The Iris that "The Flora of the USSR separates this as a distinct species, distinguished from Iris ruthenica".

Iris uniflora is a tentatively accepted name by the RHS.

== Distribution and habitat ==
Iris uniflora is native to temperate regions of Asia.

=== Range ===
It is found in Central Asia (including Transylvania), Russia (including the states of Siberia, Primorye and Transbaikalia) Mongolia, Tibet, Korea and China (including Heilongjiang, Jilin, Liaoning, Manchuria and Qinghai ).

=== Habitat ===
It grows on the grasslands (steppes) on the forest margins, in deciduous woods, hillsides and mountain slopes.

It was found in the Quercus forests in the Amur region of Russia.

== Conservation ==
It was rare in Russia and mentioned in an early version of the Russian Red Book of Endangered Species. Currently not in the 2013 list. One population of iris uniflora is now under the protection of Lazo Nature Reserve.

== Cultivation ==
It grows well in garden borders, but it only flowers in dry and sunny positions. Stable in culture, winters without shelter. Can be used for rocky hills, curb and group plantings in the southern forest-steppe and steppe regions. Differ by more than I. ruthenica, confinement to dry soils. Tested: Moscow, Khabarovsk, Vladivostok.

It is a specimen found in 7 Botanic Garden collections around the world.

In east Siberia, Aphis neonewtoni (Pashtshenko) is found on the upper sides of the leaves of Iris uniflora.

== Uses ==
It is used within Tibetan herbal medicines, the seeds are an ingredient in a remedy used to treat de-toxification and as an insecticide. The flowers are used to treat eyesight problems and the root is used to cure freckles and ringworm.

== Variants ==
Iris uniflora has only one known variant, as others found were re-classed as synonyms.

- Iris uniflora var. latifolia Skripka – which has a flower spike, growing taller than the foliage.
