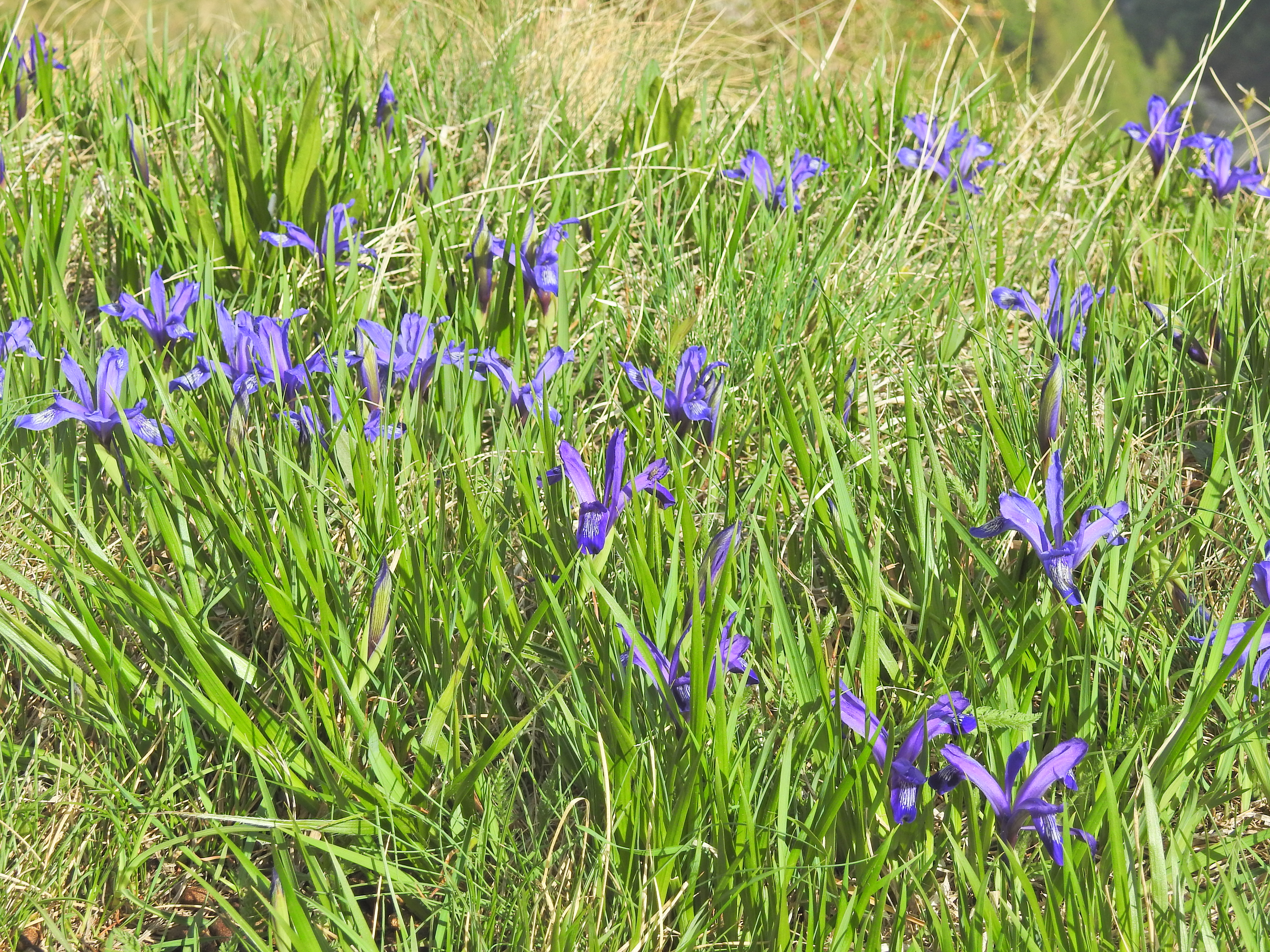
- Iris ruthenica

Scientific classification
- Kingdom: Plantae
- Clade: Tracheophytes
- Clade: Angiosperms
- Clade: Monocots
- Order: Asparagales
- Family: Iridaceae
- Genus: Iris
- Subgenus: Iris subg. Limniris
- Section: Iris sect. Limniris
- Series: Iris ser. Ruthenicae

= Iris ser. Ruthenicae =

Group of flowering plants

Iris ser. Ruthenicae is a series of the genus Iris, in Iris. subg. Limniris.

The series was first classified by Diels in 'Die Natürlichen Pflanzenfamilien' (Edited by H. G. A. Engler and K. Prantl) in 1930. It was further expanded by Lawrence in Gentes Herb (written in Dutch) in 1953.

It is similar to Iris verna.

The species have a flower spike that appears before the leaves. Although the leaves sometimes continue through the winter in the UK.

The two species have pear shaped seeds, that have a white appendage. They also have rounded seed capsules (less than 1.5 cm long), which have three valves that curl back to release the seed.

The species are native in a region from the Carpathians (in Europe) to the Asian coast.

Includes:

Image	Scientific name	Distribution
	Iris ruthenica Ker-Gawl.	Russia through Central Asia, Romania, Turkestan, Kazakhstan, Mongolia, China and Korea.
	Iris uniflora Pallas	Russia, Mongolia, China and Korea
