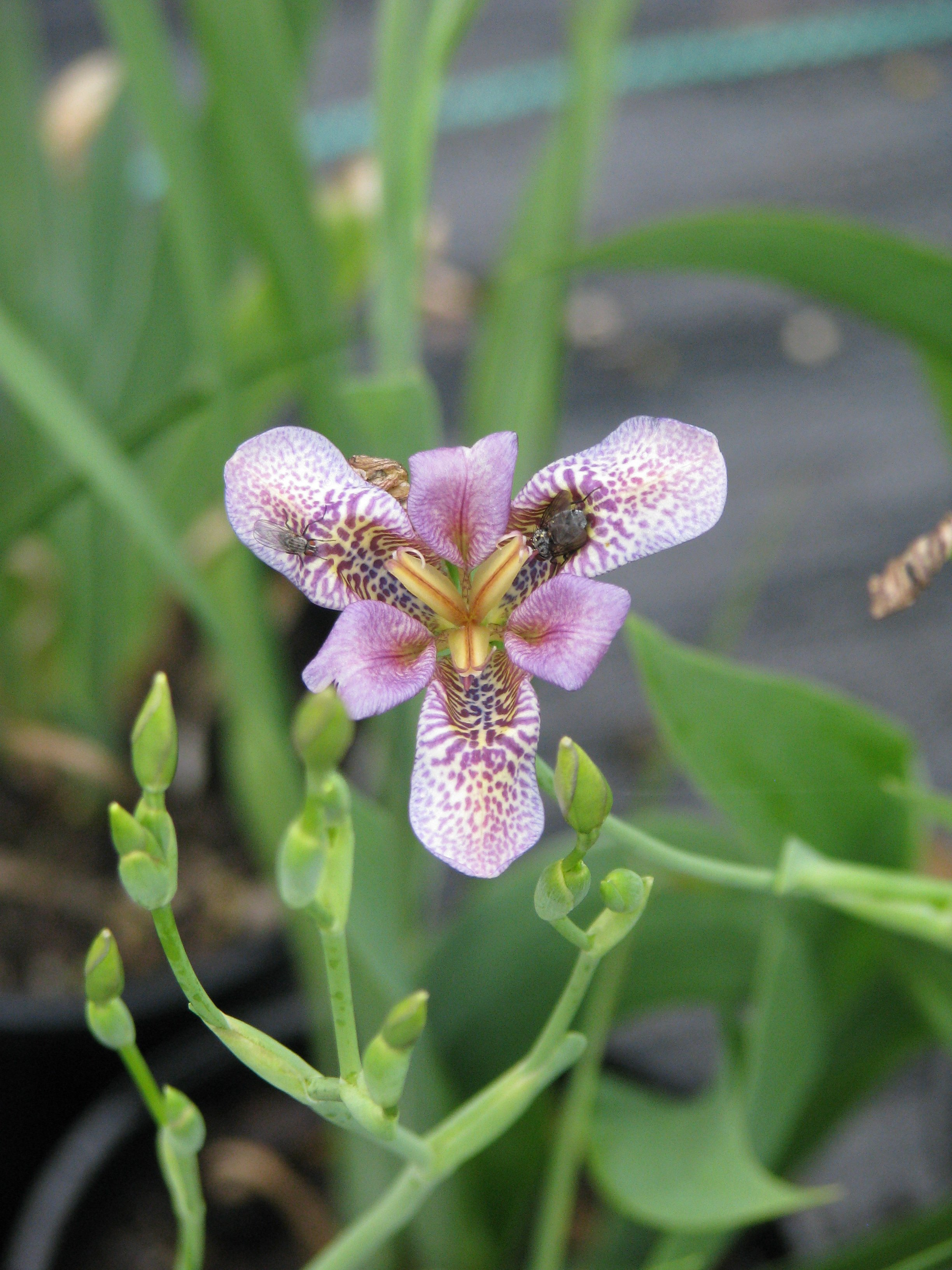

Scientific classification
- Kingdom: Plantae
- Clade: Tracheophytes
- Clade: Angiosperms
- Clade: Monocots
- Order: Asparagales
- Family: Iridaceae
- Genus: Iris
- Species: I. dichotoma

Binomial name
- Iris dichotoma Pall.

Synonyms
- Evansia dichotoma (Pall.) Decne.; Evansia vespertina Decne.; Iris pomeridiana Fisch. ex Klatt; Pardanthopsis dichotoma (Pall.) L.W.Lenz; Pardanthopsis dichotoma (Pall.) Ledeb.; Pardanthus dichotomus (Pall.) Ledeb.

= Iris dichotoma =

Species of plant

Iris dichotoma (also known as Vesper iris) is a species in the genus Iris and is also in the subgenus of Iris. It was once formerly known as Pardanthopsis dichotoma as it was placed in a genus of its own before DNA testing resulted in it returning to the genus Iris. It is native to the forests and grasslands of Siberia, China, Mongolia and Korea. It has long greyish green leaves, long branched stems carrying many flowers in summer or late summer. In shades of violet, mauve to purple, lavender, pale blue, white or pink. They appear in the late afternoon at the time of Vespers (a service of evening prayer).

== Description ==
Iris dichotoma grows from a small fibrous rhizome that is stout and very short. Underneath the rhizome, it has thick and swollen roots.

It has numerous typical iris-looking leaves that are similar in form to a bearded iris, except fan shaped. They are also similar to a Vanda orchid's leaves. They grow from the base of rhizome (i.e. basal) and are sword-shaped, greyish green and slightly curved. The leaves have no midvein and can grow between 15–35 cm (6–14 in) long and 1.5–3 cm (1–1 in) wide.

It has dichotomously or multi-branched stems which can grow up to between 90–120 cm (35–47 in) tall. The tall stems keep the flowers much higher than the foliage of the leaves, and they have 4 or 5 leafy spathes (leaves of the flower bud), which are green, lanceolate (spear-like) shaped and 1.5–2.3 cm (1–1 in) long.

It blooms in the US between May and midsummer. Elsewhere, it begins to bloom in summer, or late summer, between July and early August.

It unusually blooms in the late afternoon, around 3 o'clock or 4 o'clock. This occurs at the time of hearing Vespers, hence its common name 'Vespers iris'. They fully open out in just a couple of minutes, but only last one day, as they twist into tight little spirals after dark and then drop from the stem. Withered flowers are never normally seen on the stems.

Each stem can hold between 3–6 flowers. A well-established plant can have nearly hundreds of flowers, and the display of flowers can last for up to 3 to 4 weeks. The flowers are fragrant. As the flowers (and nectar) are extremely attractive to hummingbirds and honeybees, cross-pollination can take place and seeds can be formed.

The flowers are small, at about 1 in (25 mm) long.

They come in various shades from violet, mauve to purple, purple, lavender, pale blue, white, (rarely), cream, or pink.

Like other irises, it has 2 pairs of petals, 3 large sepals (outer petals), known as the 'falls' and 3 inner smaller petals (or tepals), known as the 'standards'.

The outer petals are broadly oblanceolate shaped (much longer than wide and with the widest portion near the tip), 3–3.5 cm (1–1 in) long and about 1 cm wide. The 'claw' (section closest to the centre) is striped, or reticulated (marked with a grid), with yellowish brown and the limb (the end part) has darker spots on a central, pale patch. The patch can have a whitish colour tinged with green and the spots can be lilac-mauve, brown-purple, or red-purple. The tips of the falls are free from any spots or markings. The plain inner petals are narrowly obovate shaped (teardrop-like), 2.5 cm (1 in) long and 6–8 mm wide, with a retuse apex (rounded end with a depression).

It has very distinct arms on the flower style, which are 2.5 cm (1 in) long, with purplish brown markings.

Its perianth tube is extremely short or missing. It has stamens that are 1.6–1.8 cm (1–1 in) long and a green ovary that is 1 cm long.

After it has flowered, the plant will produce a seed capsule and seeds, between August and September.

The seed capsule is cylindric in shape, yellowish-green and 3.5–5 cm (1–2 in) long and 1–1.2 cm (0–0 in) wide. Inside, it has elongated, or elliptic shaped, and dark brown, or brown coloured seeds, that have small wings compared to Iris domestica and related hybrids, which have large round black seeds.

=== Genetics ===
As most irises are diploid, having two sets of chromosomes, this can be used to identify hybrids and classification of groupings. It has a chromosome count of 2n=32. It was counted three times:

- Doronkin, V. M. & A. A. Krasnikov. 1984. "Cytotaxonomic studies in some Siberian species of the genus Iris (Iridaceae)". Bot. Zhurn. SSSR 65 (5): 683–685. (In Russian).
- Sha, W., L. h. Wang, X. j. Yang, X. l. Qi, G. h. Ma & D. y. Zhao. 1995. "Chromosome numbers of 20 species from north-east China". J. Wuhan Bot. Res. 32 (2): 180–182.
- Yan, G. x., S. z. Zheng, F. h. Xue, J. f. Yun, L. y. Wang & X. q. Fu. 1995. "The chromosome numbers of 35 forage species and their geographical distribution". Grassl. China 1995 (1): 16–20.

=== Biochemistry ===
The rhizome of Iris dichotoma Pall. contains isoflavonoids as the main bioactive compound.

The chloroplast of I. dichotoma phylogeography (geography and genetics) in Asia has been studied.

== Taxonomy ==
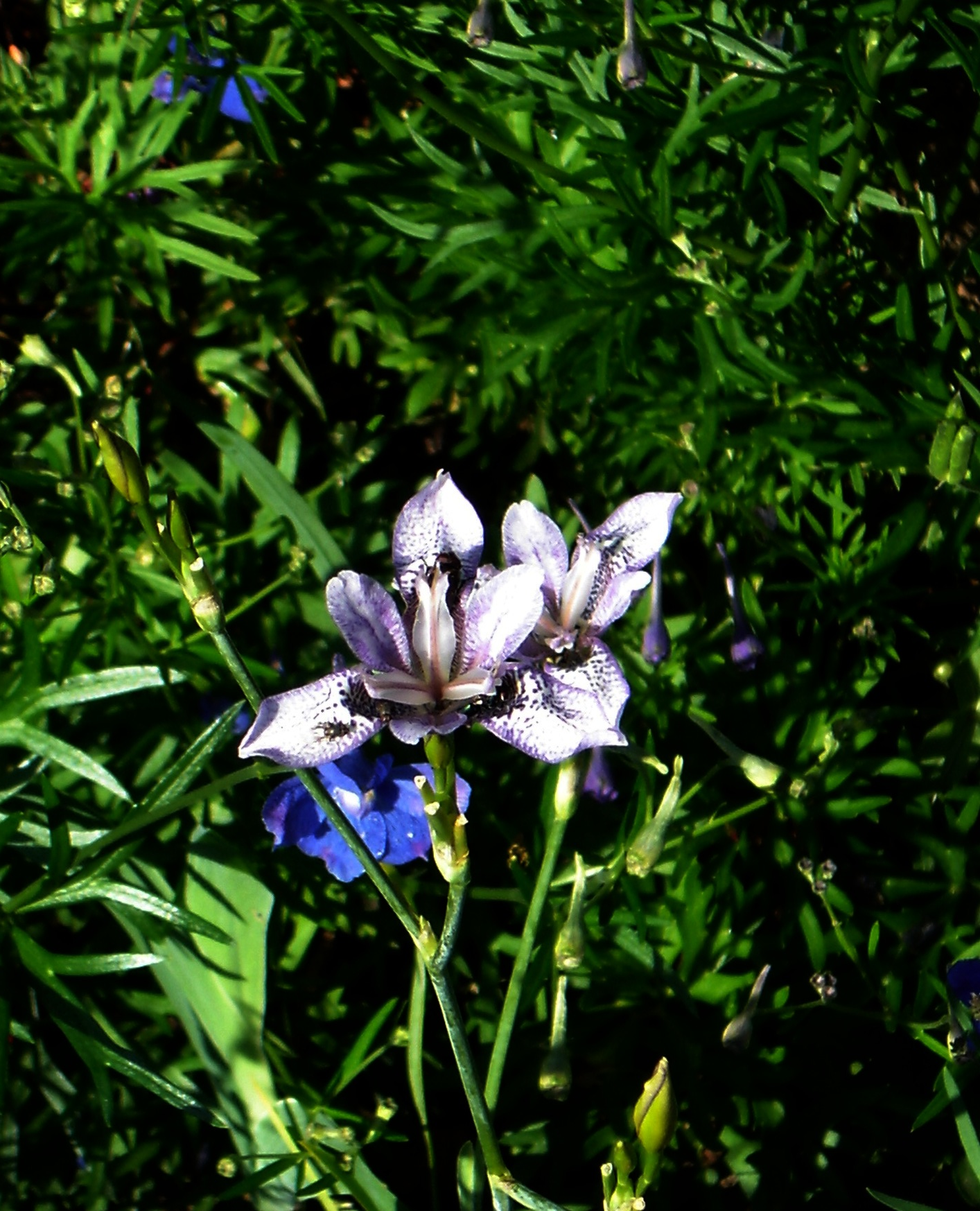
Iris dichotoma

Iris dichotoma is pronounced as EYE-ris dy-KAW-toh-muh.

It is written as 野鸢尾 in Chinese script and known as ye yuan wei.

It has common name of 'Vesper iris' as the blooms open up at around 4:00 pm each day, just in time for Vespers. It is also thought to be commonly known as 'autumn iris' and 'blue curls' in the UK, although Trichostema dichotomum is normally commonly called 'blue curls'.

The Latin specific epithet dichotoma means divided into two equal portions, equal-branched or split into two, or forked.

Iris dichotoma was first published and described by Peter Simon Pallas in 'Reise Russ. Reich.' (Reise durch Verschiedene Provinzen des Russischen Reichs.) Vol. 3 on page 712 in 1776.

In 1972, using morphological studies, botanist Lee Wayne Lenz re-classified the species as a separate species and renamed it Pardanthopsis dichotoma which he then published in Aliso Vol. 7 on page 403. Its lack of perianth tube was the feature that originally separated it from other iris species.

In 1998, Goldblatt in (Klaus Kubitzki (ed.)) The Families and Genera of Vascular Plants Vol. 3 on page 326, also noted that it was a monospecific genus between Iris and Belamcamda.

In 2001, based on DNA analysis, Pardanthopsis was then merged back into the genus Iris, and the name Iris dichotoma Pall. was used again. Occasionally, the former name Pardanthopsis dichotoma is still used.

It was verified by United States Department of Agriculture's Agricultural Research Service on 25 October 2005 as Iris dichotoma, and it was last-listed in the RHS Plant Finder in 2017.

== Distribution and habitat ==
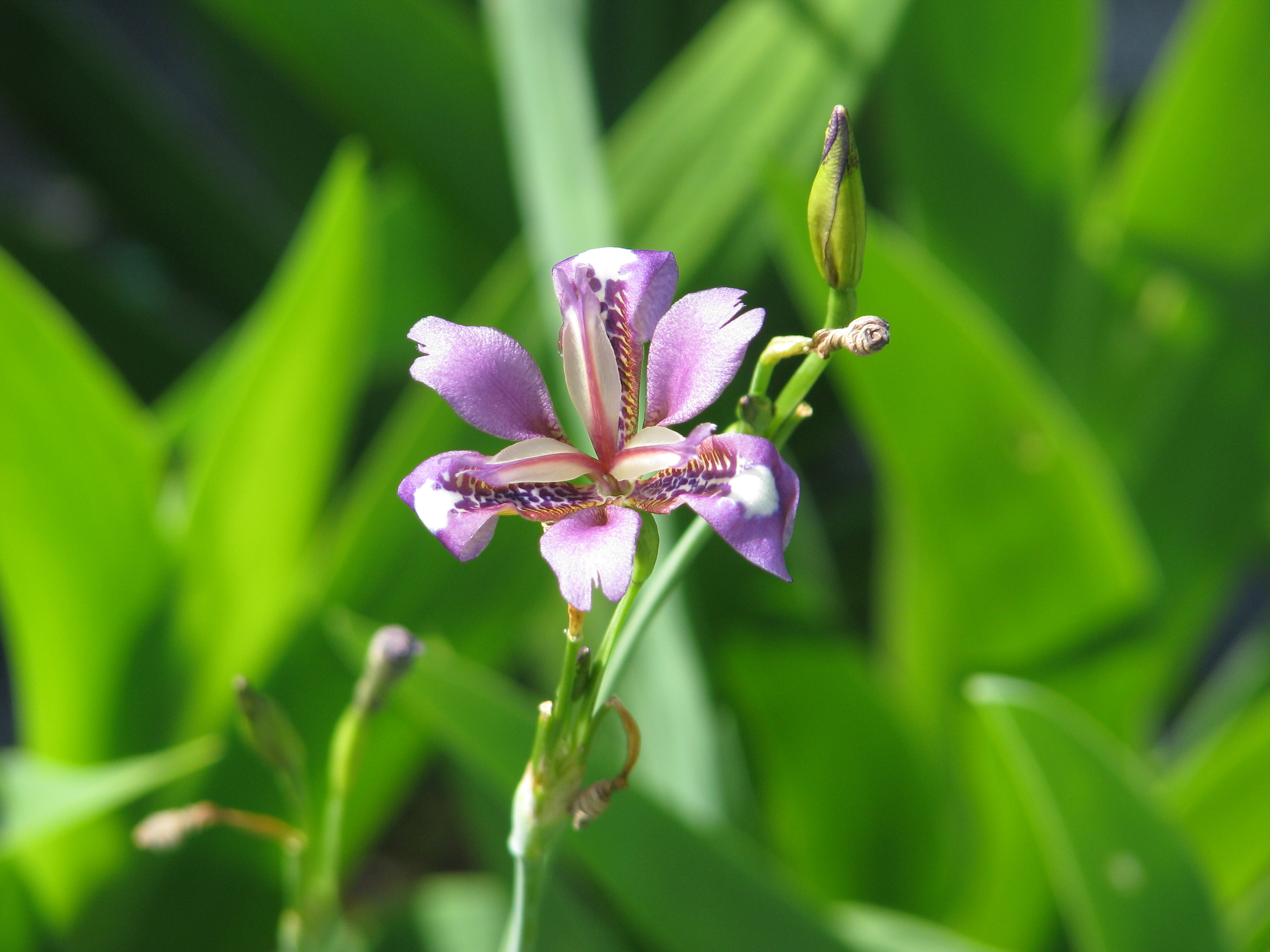
Iris dichotoma

I. dichotoma is native to temperate regions of Asia.

=== Range ===
It is found in Siberia, near Lake Baikal, and the Dahuria region, as well as near the Russian Federation city of Chita, and also in the Russian Federation state of Amur.

It is also found in Mongolia, Korea, and in China within the Chinese provinces of Anhui, Gansu, Hebei, Heilongjiang, Henan, Hubei, Hunan, Jiangxi, Jilin, Liaoning, Nei Mongol, Ningxia, Shaanxi, Shandong, Shanxi and Yunnan.

=== Habitat ===
"Iris dichotoma" grows in Quercus (oak) forests, sandy grasslands, and dry sunny areas, which have moist fertile soils. It can be found at an altitude of 200–2,300 m (660–7,550 ft) above sea level.

== Cultivation ==
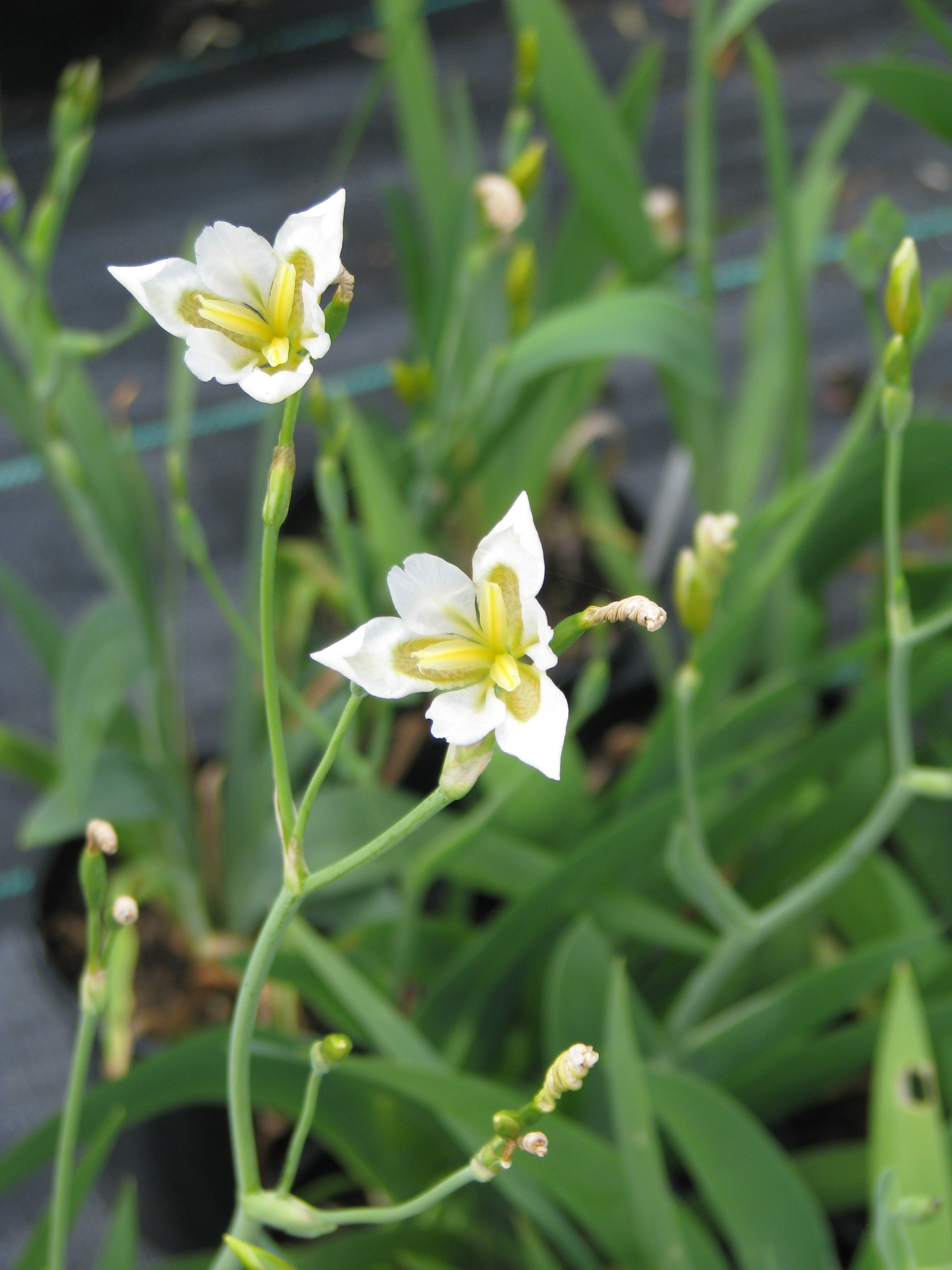
Iris dichotoma

Iris dichotoma is difficult to cultivate and they are not recommended for amateurs, thought more as a collector's plant. They are often treated as a biennial by many gardeners as it can be quite short lived, especially the hybrids.

It is hardy to between USDA Zone 6 and Zone 10, meaning it can withstand temperatures down to −23.3 °C (−10 °F), or −20 °C. It requires no winter protection (in Pittsburgh).

It prefers to grow in well-drained, humus-rich garden soil. It can tolerate neutral or acidic soils, pH levels between 6.5 and 7.5.

It prefers positions in full sun, but it needs to be kept well-watered and fertilized, especially to get flowers in the first summer. It is drought-tolerant once established, but prefers regular watering.

Within the garden, it can be combined in July with trumpet lilies (Lilium brownii, Lilium henryi, or Lilium regale) or Galtonia candicans in a white garden. It could also be paired with other evening bloomers like Cestrum and Jasminum in a night garden or alternatively morning flowering Hemerocallis (day lilies) to create lauds and vespers section in a garden.

=== Propagation ===
Irises can generally be propagated by division, or by seed growing. The fibrous root system of the iris enables the plant to be separated simply and then the young plants to be transplanted.

==== Seeds ====
After allowing the seed pods to dry on plant, break open capsules to collect seeds.Known germination tip: soak the seeds. Place in warm water until seeds swell, usually between 24 and 48 hours. Then remove floaters (these will not germinate) and the water can be re-used for soaking.

Seeds are best sown in the spring; germination is normally easy. Seeds are sown at temperatures at about 20 °C and can germinate within 3 months. An alternate method involves cold storage (or vernalization). Seeds can be sown in pots or flat trays and then refrigerate for 4 to 6 weeks. After coming out of cold storage, seeds should germinate in a week or two. After the threat of frost has passed, it is safe to transplant seedlings outdoors.

The seedlings dislike transplanting when they grow too large. The plant may flower the first year, if started very early (February–March) and planted out after the last frosts of the year.

== Cultivars ==
Known cultivars: 'Dichotoma Alba', 'Shilka'.

Known crosses (Iris dichotoma and other iris): 'Ai Hua', 'Auroral Sail, 'Azure Pinwheel, 'Blazing Sunflower', Bountiful Blush', 'Bright Smile'. 'Butterfly Magic', 'Candy Lilies', 'Cherry Pie', 'Chic Leopard', 'Chocolate Knight', 'Colorful Stelleroid', 'Dancing Woman', 'Daybreak Sail', 'Dazzler Series', 'Fiery Rhapsody, 'Fire Leaf', 'Happy Yanyan', 'Heart Of Darkness', 'Jungle Colors', 'Kiba Giants' 'Laced Lavender', 'Lost Bar', 'Mandarin Lady', 'Moonlit Hairpin', 'Orange Diamond', 'Pastel Parfait', 'Pink Leopard', 'Romantic Celebration', 'Rosy Brocade', 'Sangria', 'Seiya Hui', 'Sharp Shine', 'Sheng Ni', 'Shining Butterfly', 'Slight Smile', 'Sparkling Fire', 'Star Eyes', 'Spooky World', 'Spotted Dog Hui', 'Starlit Shell', 'Starry Bodhi', 'Summer Candy', 'Summer Snow', 'Sunset Tones'. 'Sweet Princess' and 'Wedding Dress'.

=== Candy lily ===
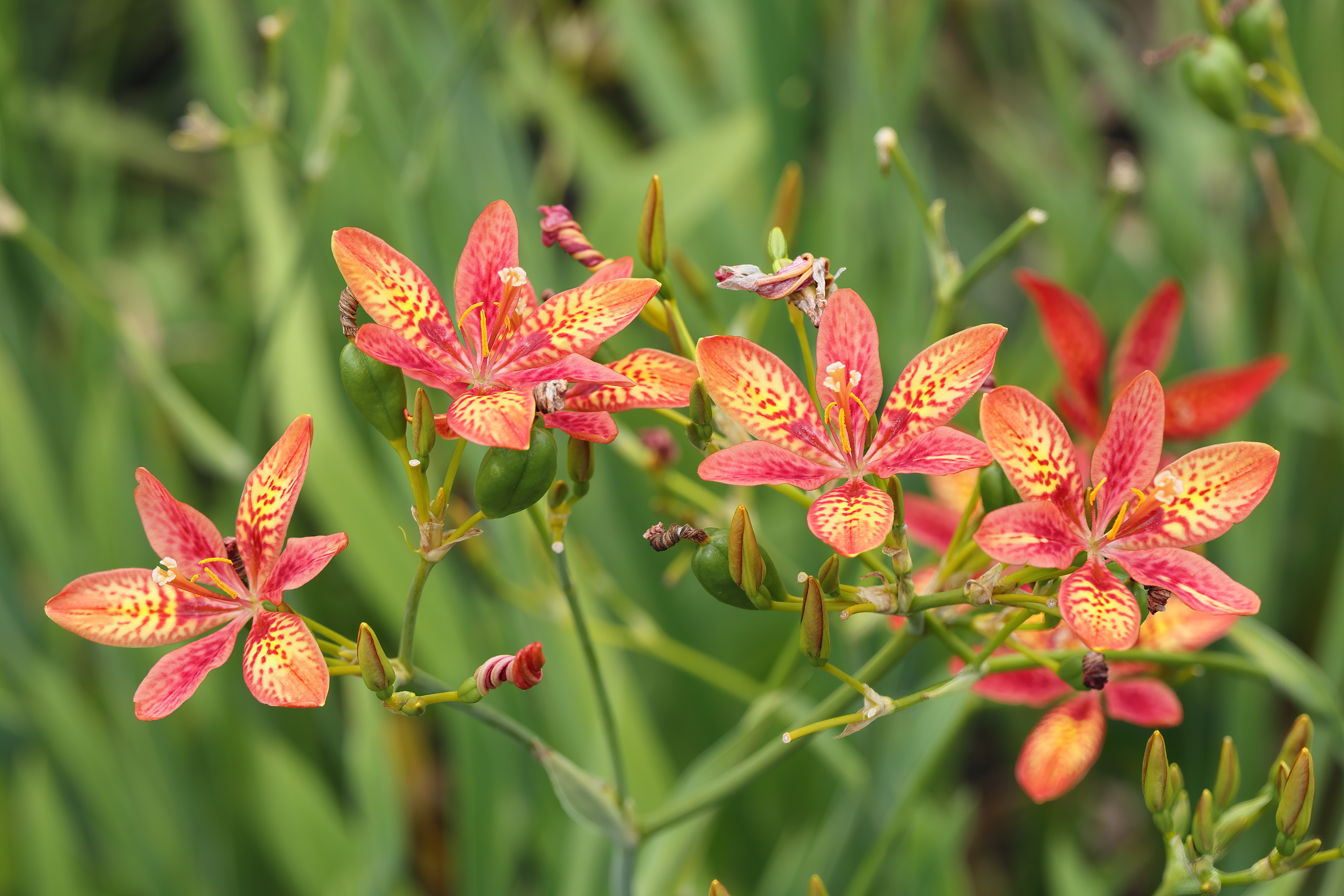
Candy lily, Roger-Van den Hende botanical garden

There is also an intergeneric hybrid between Belamcanda chinensis (also Iris domestica) and Pardanthopsis dichotoma (also Iris dichotoma) called the candy lily, which is also called "x Pardancanda norrisii". The 'x' in front of the name is to show that it is a man-made primary hybrid between two different genera.

In 1967, Samuel Norris, a plant breeder from Kentucky, crossed I. dichotoma with Iris domestica. The hybrid obtained was named Pardancanda norrisii. When the name of Pardanthopsis dichotoma was returned to the Iris genus, the scientific name of the candy lily also had to be renamed; the name is now Iris x norrisii.

It can reach 60 to 90 cm 60–90 cm (24–35 in) tall. Like I. dichotoma, it has flowers that last for one day but can keep blooming for weeks. It blooms in the summer and has saucer-shaped flowers. They have seedpods between August and October that split to show the black seeds, similar to the blackberry lily (or B. chinensis).

The candy lily has its own cultivars as well; Pardancanda 'Sangria' is a purple strain with deep purple and golden yellow patterned petals, and 'Kiba Giants' has flowers that are variable between yellow, red and violet.

== Uses ==
Iris dichotoma is used in Chinese herbal medicine, and has been used to treat several disorders, such as inflammation, throat disorders, asthma and coughs.

== Toxicity ==
Like many other irises, most parts of the plant are poisonous (especially the rhizome and leaves), and if mistakenly ingested they can cause stomach pains and vomiting. Handling the plant may cause a skin irritation or an allergic reaction.

== Other sources ==
- Czerepanov, S. K. 1995. Vascular plants of Russia and adjacent states (the former USSR) Cambridge University Press. Note: = Pardanthopsis dichotoma (Pall.) L. W. Lenz
- Komarov, V. L. et al., eds. 1934–1964. Flora SSSR.
- Mathew, B. 1981. The Iris. 184. Note: = Pardanthopsis dichotoma (Pall.) L. W. Lenz
- Wu Zheng-yi & P. H. Raven et al., eds. 1994–. Flora of China (English edition).
