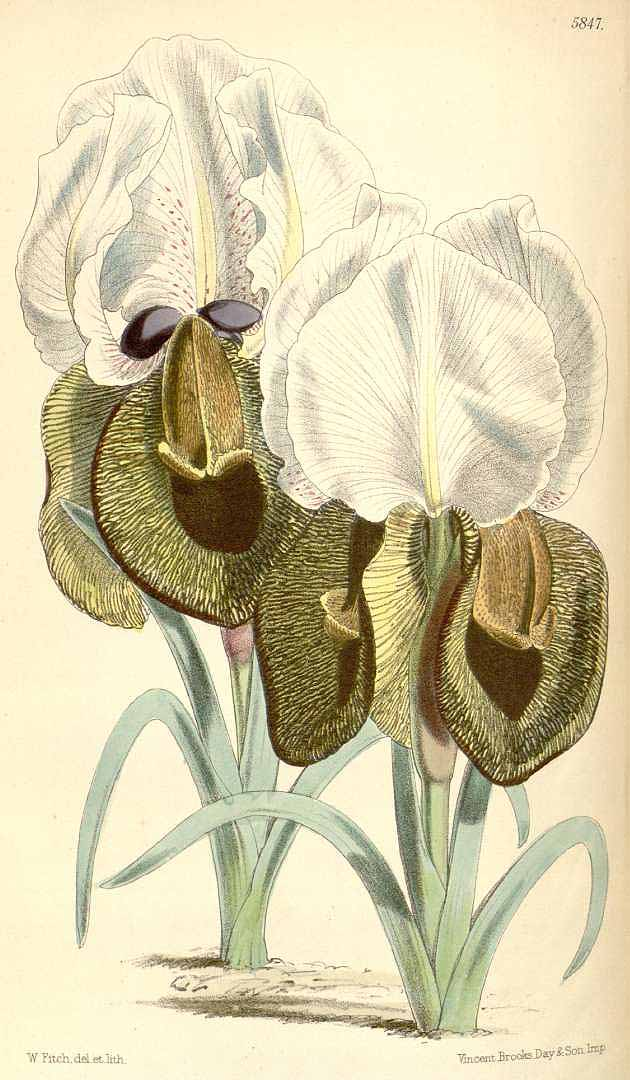
- Illustration of an Iris iberica for Curtis's Botanical Magazine Vol.96 in 1870 by Walter Hood Fitch

Scientific classification
- Kingdom: Plantae
- Clade: Tracheophytes
- Clade: Angiosperms
- Clade: Monocots
- Order: Asparagales
- Family: Iridaceae
- Genus: Iris
- Subgenus: Iris subg. Iris
- Section: Iris sect. Oncocyclus
- Species: I. iberica

Binomial name
- Iris iberica Georg Franz Hoffmann

Synonyms
- Iris georgica Gueldenst.; Iris iberica subsp. iberica (Unknown); Iris iberica var. robusta Sosn.; Oncocyclus ibericus (Steven) Siemssen

= Iris iberica =

Species of plant

Iris iberica is a plant species in the genus Iris, it is also in the subgenus Iris and in the section Oncocyclus. It is a rhizomatous perennial, from the Caucasus Mountains of Armenia, eastern Georgia, and western Azerbaijan. It has narrow, glaucous, gray-green and sickle shaped leaves, short stem holding a single flower in late spring. Which has a pale background (white, cream or pale blue) covered with heavy veining in pale mauve, violet, dark purple, maroon or purple-brown. It has a black or dark purple signal patch and a brown or purple-brown beard. Although, it has many hybrid forms dues to its variability and has 2 known subspecies of Iris iberica subsp. elegantissima and Iris iberica subsp. lycotis. It is cultivated as an ornamental plant in temperate regions, as it is hardier than other Oncocyclus species.

== Description ==
It is similar to Iris susiana, apart from its leaf and flower form. It is classed as an Mezo-xerophyte, (meaning they like intermediate dry conditions.) or xeric species (similar to Seseli grandivittatum, Thymus tiflisiensis, Scorzonera eriosperma and Tulipa eichleri).

It has a slender, and compact rhizome, that is not stoloniferous, but up to 1.5 cm in diameter.

They have 4–6 leaves, that are glaucous, grey-green, and falcate, (sickle shaped) or curved. They can grow up to between 7.5 and 15 cm (3 and 6 in) long, and are narrow, being between 0.2 and 0.6 cm wide. The leaves start to grow in Autumn (near to September), after a summer rest period after flowering.

It has a short, slender stem or peduncle, that can grow up to between 15 and 20 cm (6 and 8 in) tall.

The stem has a green, lanceolate, membranous, spathes (leaves of the flower bud), which are variable is size, between 3 mm and 5 cm long. The stems hold a solitary, terminal (top of stem) flower, blooming in late spring, between March and May. In the UK, it blooms later between May and June. The flowers can last between 120 and 145 days before fading.

The flowers are 10–15 cm (4–6 in) in diameter, they are described as big and flouncy.

The very variable, bi-coloured flowers, have a white, silvery white, cream, or pale bluish background, with heavily stippled, spotted or veined in pale mauve, violet, dark purple, maroon, or purple-brown. Some forms can have a lilac background.

Like other irises, it has 2 pairs of petals, 3 large sepals (outer petals), known as the 'falls' and 3 inner, smaller petals (or tepals), known as the 'standards'. The falls are spoon-shaped, or obovate (rounded), and reflexed, or concave. They are 3.5–6.5 cm (1–3 in) long, and 2.7–6.5 cm wide. In the center of the falls, is a velvet-like, dark, deep rich purple, black-purple, brown, or blackish blotch or signal patch. Also, in the middle of the falls, is a row of short hairs called the 'beard', which are brown, or purplish brown. The pale standards, are round, or orbicular, and 4.5–10 cm (2–4 in) long. They are normally less veined than the falls, or have paler veining.

It has style branches that are as long as the falls, brown and3.5–7 cm (1–3 in) long, with scalloped lobes. The perianth tube is 2–3.5 cm long/

After the iris has flowered, in June, it produces a seed capsule, which is 7–9 cm (3–4 in) long, and 2–2.5 cm wide. The capsule holds 56–60 wrinkled seeds, which are about 0.5 cm in diameter. Only between 10 and 30% of the seeds are fertile.

=== Biochemistry ===
As most irises are diploid, having two sets of chromosomes, this can be used to identify hybrids and classification of groupings. It has a chromosome count: 2n=20, counted by Delauney in 1928. Then by Marc Simonet in 1932 and then by Avishai & Zohary in 1977. It has an unnamed alkaloid (as of 1961), contained within its rhizome.

== Taxonomy ==
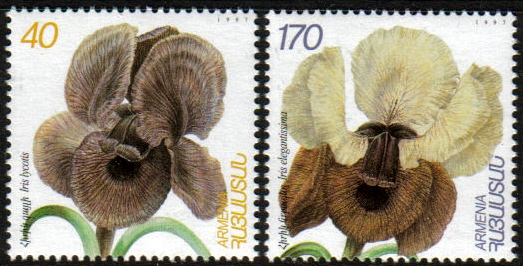
Armenia produced stamps for Iris elegantissima and Iris lycotis (subspecies of Iris iberica)

Iris iberica is pronounced as EYE-ris eye-BEER-ee-kuh, and is commonly known as Iberian Iris, or Georgian Iris.

One reference mistakenly lists its common name as 'Chalcedonian iris', but this is normally used for Iris susiana.

The Latin specific epithet iberica refers to ibericus -a -um, coming from the Georgian Caucasus, or eastern Turkey.

It was originally found in Transcaucasus, and it was first published and described by Georg Franz Hoffmann in Vol.1 page 41 of Commentationes Societatis Physico-Medicae apud Universitatem Litteratum Caesaream Mosquensem Institutae (Commentat. Soc. Phys.-Med. Univ. Litt. Caes. Mosq.), published in Moscow in 1808.

Although a few references state it was published by Steven in Fl. Taur.-Caucas. Vol.1 on page 30 in 1808, as Iris iberica Steven.

It was also published as Iris iberica in Gartenflora page3 in 1863, then in Curtis's Botanical Magazine Table 5847 in 1870 and Revue Horticole Vol.45 page 370 on 1 October 1873.

Due to its variability of form, it has two known subspecies, Iris iberica ssp. elegantissima, (grows 20–30 cm in height with flowers 10 cm in diameter having a cream or pale yellow ground colour), and Iris iberica ssp. lycotis. Another known subspecies is Iris iberica subsp. iberica, but this name is also used for the standard form of the iris as well. In between I. iberica and I. iberica ssp. lycotis are a large range of forms.

It was verified by United States Department of Agriculture and the Agricultural Research Service on 4 April 2003, then changed on 1 December 2004.

It is listed in the Encyclopedia of Life, and in the Catalogue of Life as Iris iberica Steven.

Iris iberica is an accepted name by the RHS.

== Distribution and habitat ==
It is native to temperate Asia.

=== Range ===
I. iberica and its subspecies comes from a wide range across the Caucasus Mountains, although I. iberica subsp. elegantissima is found in eastern Turkey from near the Armenian border to Lake Van. I. iberica subsp. lycotis is found in north western Iran near Hakkari, Turkey on the Iranian border and southern Armenia on the Iranian border. I. iberica itself is found only in eastern Georgia, (near Tbilisi,) Armenia, and western Azerbaijan.

=== Habitat ===
It grows on the dry grasslands of the steppes, or on the dry stony slopes of the lower mountain belt. It grows on steppes of Georgia with various spear grass communities (including Stipa pulcherrima, Stipa lessingiana, Stipa pontica and Stipa capillata), with scattered shrubs of red juniper and berberis. They can be found at an altitude of 400 to 700 m (1,300 to 2,300 ft), or 1,000 to 3,000 m (3,300 to 9,800 ft) above sea level.

== Conservation ==
The iris is rare and endangered species, and was listed in the Red Book of the USSR, (in ) and on the Red List of Georgia. Although, it was not included in the first edition of the Red Data Book of Armenia, (published in 1988,) or also not included in the Annexes of CITES and that of the Bern Convention. It is thought to be close to being extinct in Armenia, due to the effects of land development, in Georgia it was fairly common in selected sites, but has been picked and sold in markets, which has affected the iris populations. It is also affected by loss of habitat due to human activity.

== Cultivation ==
'Oncocyclus Section' Irises are generally harder to grow than 'Regelia Section' irises. I. iberica is hardy to European Zone 4, (meaning hardy to −5 to −10 °C (23 to 14 °F). This includes parts of Europe, where it can be planted in a sunny, rock garden position, in sandy soil. Although it grows best within a cold frame or alpine house. In order to protect the iris from excess moisture (especially during winter times) and also to ensure the (shallow planted) rhizomes get the best temperatures during the growing season. They can be grown in pots (especially in deep ones known as 'long toms'), but they need re-potting, every 2 years and extra feeding. Watering is one of the most critical aspects of iris cultivation. It can suffer from aphids, viruses and rots. I. iberica is affected by fungal Puccinia iridis. It is also the host plant of Mononychus schoenherrii Kolenati (a weevil that feeds on the seeds of the iris). The weevil lays its eggs within seed capsule of the iris, later the larvae feed on the seed and then pupates. Adult weevils emerge from the seed capsules, fly off for aestivation (summer dormancy) and hibernation. A specimen of the iris can be found in the Herbarium Hookerianum within the Royal Botanic Gardens, Kew.

=== Propagation ===
Irises can generally be propagated by division, or by seed growing. Irises generally require a period of cold, then a period of warmth and heat, also they need some moisture. Some seeds need stratification, (the cold treatment), which can be carried out indoors or outdoors. Seedlings are generally potted on (or transplanted) when they have 3 leaves. Oncoyclus irises dislike division, but it should only be carried out when the plant is overcrowded. Although hand pollination and germinating seedlings gives better results.

=== Hybrids and cultivars ===
I. iberica has been used to make many various hybrids and cultivars. Most hybrids are sterile, only one hybrid produced a second generation seedling, that was from I. iberica x Iris pallida, produced by Professor M. Foster. Mr Foster was one of the first to breed several hybrids, including Iris parabid is a hybrid between I. Iberica and Iris paradoxa, I. ibpall (I. iberica x Iris pallida), I. ibvar (I. iberica x Iris variegata), and I. iberica x Iris susiana and I. susiana x I. iberica. The hybrids are very free flowering similar to Iris germanica. Cornelius Gerrit Van Tubergen jr of Haarlem in Holland was another major breeder of irises, including I. iberica x Iris germanica macrantha which produced a large (6 in) blue flower with a black blue signal spot, but he found the irises need the dry baking heat in summer, so they do not freely produce flowers in Europe.

Other I. iberica crosses include; Iris susiana X I. iberica: 'Charcoal Grey', and 'Van Houteii'. Iris lortetii X I. Iberica: 'Iberian Gem', 'Mustapha Kemal', and 'Shah-Shah' (Soft cream white standards; cream falls, stippled and dotted dark henna, black signal). I. iberica X Iris sari: 'Iblup'. I. iberica and Iris paradoxa: 'Koenigii'. I. iberica X Onco-hybrid: 'Indigent Arab' (Silver grey ground with light brown veining, falls heavily veined brown, small dark brown signal), and 'Ord Mountain' (Grey standards, heavily veined and dotted dark red brown; near black falls in center with grey ground speckling at hafts and on edge, it is a collected natural hybrid of Iris lycotis, X Iris 'Vulcan's Forge'). Oncocyclus Hybrid X I. iberica: 'Judas' (White standards, veined and flushed greyed purple; white falls, almost completely obscured by coarse veining and speckling of greyed purple, large black violet signal, C. G. White W-201 X I. iberica). Iris korolkowii X I. iberica crosses; 'Agatha', 'Aglaia' (with purple, silver/grey and violet blooms), 'Antigone' (with black, lavender and violet blooms), 'Belisane' (I. korolkowii var. concolor X I. iberica 'Van Houtteii'), 'Bianca' (I. korolkowii var. concolor X I. iberica), 'Dardanus' (Violet standards; buff violet falls, veined darker, I. korolkowii concolor X I. iberica), 'Eunice' (I. korolkowii var. concolor X I. iberica), 'Eva' (I. korolkowii X I. iberica), 'Hecate' (Iris korolkowi violacea x I. iberica), 'Iphigenia' (blue blooms), 'Irene' (white blooms), 'Isis' (I. korolkowii var. violacea X I. iberica), 'Ismene', 'Jocaste', 'Leucothea' (I. korolkowii var. concolor X I. iberica), 'Mars', 'Persephone' (lavender blooms), 'Polyhymnia' (I. korolkowii var. violacea X I. iberica), 'Psyche' (Black, lavender, silver/grey, wine blooms) 'Sophrosyne' (I. korolkowii var. violacea X I. iberica), 'Teucros' (I. korolkowii var. concolor X I. iberica, silver lilac, veined dark maroon), 'Urania' (I. korolkowii var. violacea X I. iberica, wine coloured blooms), and 'Venus' (I. korolkowii var. violacea X I. iberica, yellow blooms).

Other known hybrids include;Iris iberica X Iris pallida crosses; 'Dilkash', 'Giran', 'Ismali', 'Mestor', 'Pandora', 'Shiraz' (has wine coloured blooms), 'Shirin', 'Sir Dighton Probyn', 'Sir Trevor Lawrence', and 'Vulcan'. Iris pallida X Iris iberica : 'Nazarin', 'Nefert', 'Semele'. unknown and Iris iberica: 'Dusky Nomad' (Grey standards, heavily veined dark purple; falls same but darker, dark signal, a natural hybrid collected by J. Archibald in Persian Azerbaijan) affiliated with Iris lycotis). I. iberica X Iris cengialti : 'Dorak', Iris iberica X Iris germanica : 'Ib-Mac'. Iris iberica X Iris 'Ricardi' (a form of Iris mesopotamica mixed with Iris cypriana) : 'Ib-Ric' (wine coloured blooms). Iris iberica X Iris trojana : 'Ib-Troy'. I. camaeiris alba X I. iberica: 'Monsieur Steichen'.

Known Iris iberica cultivars include: 'Bellii' (dark lilac standards), 'Elegantissima', 'Heterochroa', 'Iberica Aurea', 'Iberica Cremea', 'Iberica Flavissima', 'Iberica Ochracea' (falls of ochraceous brown colour), 'Iberica Van Houtteii', 'Insignis', Lycotis, 'Lycotis Magnifica', 'Lycotis Pardus', 'Lycotis Typica', 'Pantera', 'Perryana' (flowers smaller than the type, with pale lilac standards), 'Robudtasorun', 'Robusta', 'Rustavi' (found in Rustavi region, has pale standards, deep chocolate veins and coffee coloured signal patch). and 'Van Houttei'.

== Toxicity ==
Like many other irises, most parts of the plant are poisonous (rhizome and leaves), and if mistakenly ingested can cause stomach pains and vomiting. Also, handling the plant may cause skin irritation or an allergic reaction.

== Sources ==
- Czerepanov, S. K. Vascular plants of Russia and adjacent states (the former USSR). 1995 (L USSR)
- Davis, P. H., ed. Flora of Turkey and the east Aegean islands. 1965–1988 (F Turk)
- Komarov, V. L. et al., eds. Flora SSSR. 1934–1964 (F USSR)
- Mathew, B. The Iris. 1981 (Iris) 52–53.
- Rechinger, K. H., ed. Flora iranica. 1963– (F Iran)
