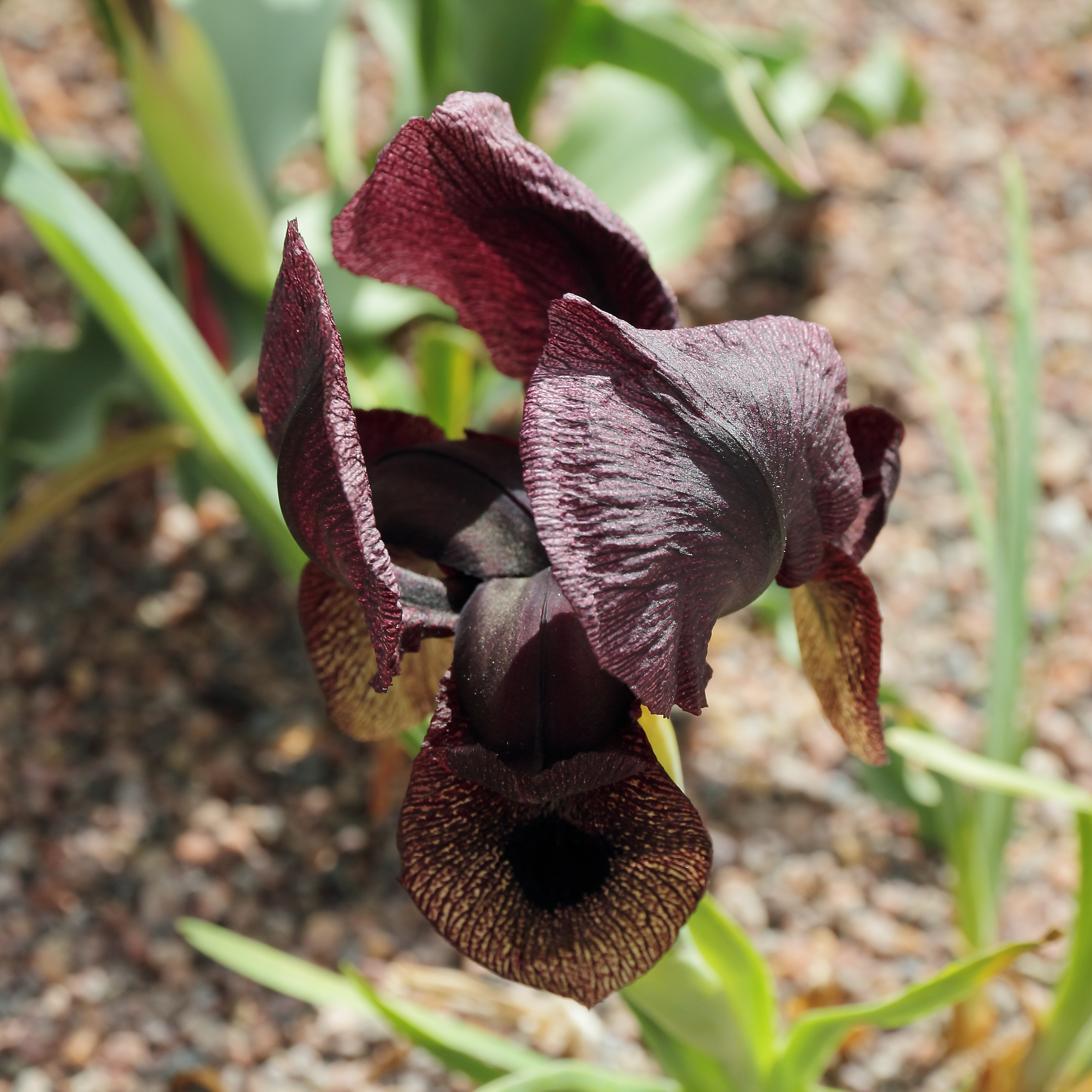

Scientific classification
- Kingdom: Plantae
- Clade: Tracheophytes
- Clade: Angiosperms
- Clade: Monocots
- Order: Asparagales
- Family: Iridaceae
- Genus: Iris
- Species: I. iberica
- Subspecies: I. i. subsp. lycotis

Trinomial name
- Iris iberica subsp. lycotis (Woronow) Takht.

= Iris iberica subsp. lycotis =

Subspecies of plant

Iris iberica subsp. lycotis is a subspecies of Iris iberica within the genus iris and family iridaceae.

== Description ==
Plants possess a stem that grows up to 30cm tall. This species flowers from April to June. Flowers are dark purple and heavily veined.

== Distribution and habitat ==
Iris iberica subsp. lycotis is native to Turkey, Iran, Iraq and South Caucasus.

This species inhabits dry, rocky soils in sloped mountain habitats.
