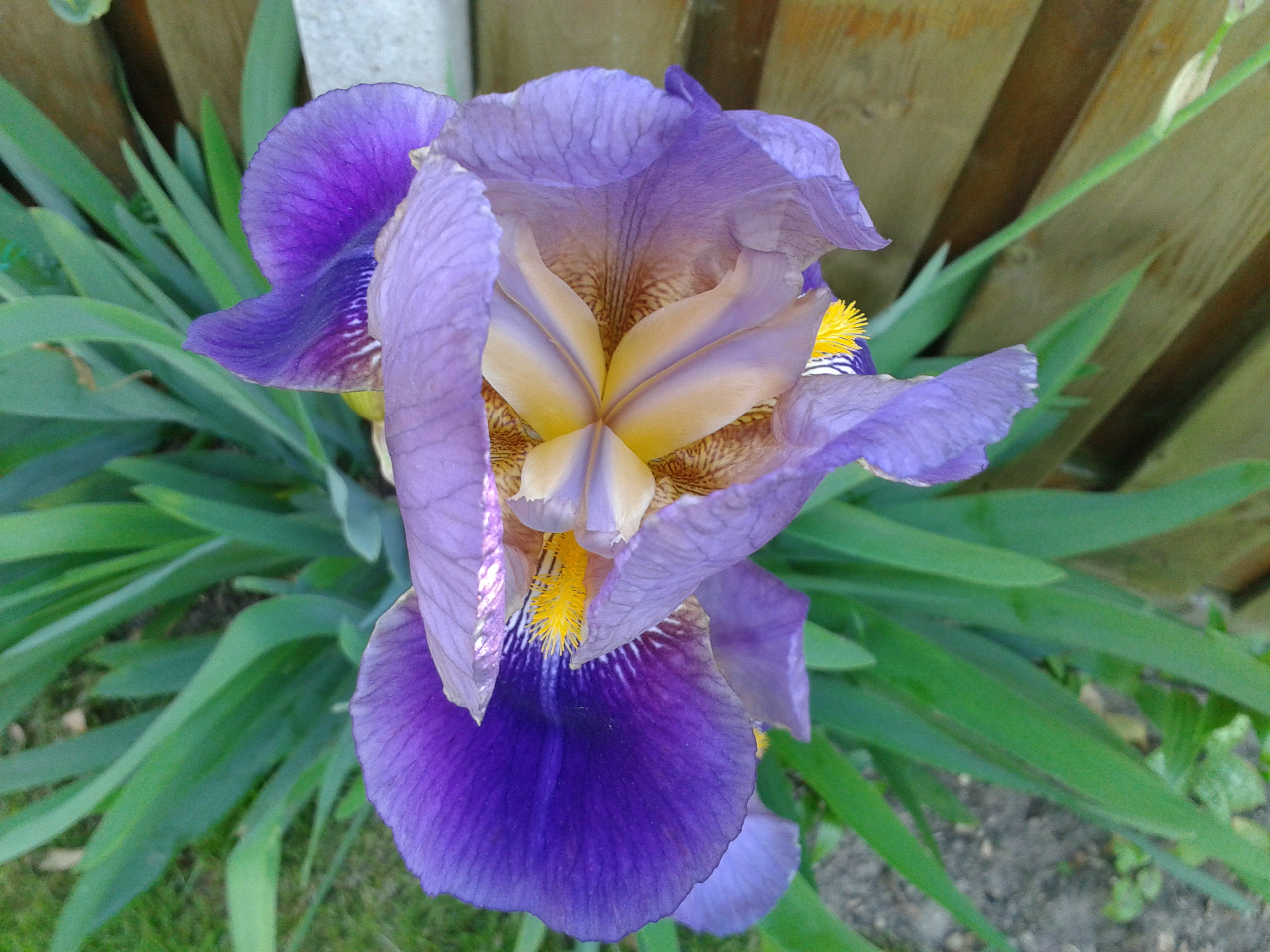

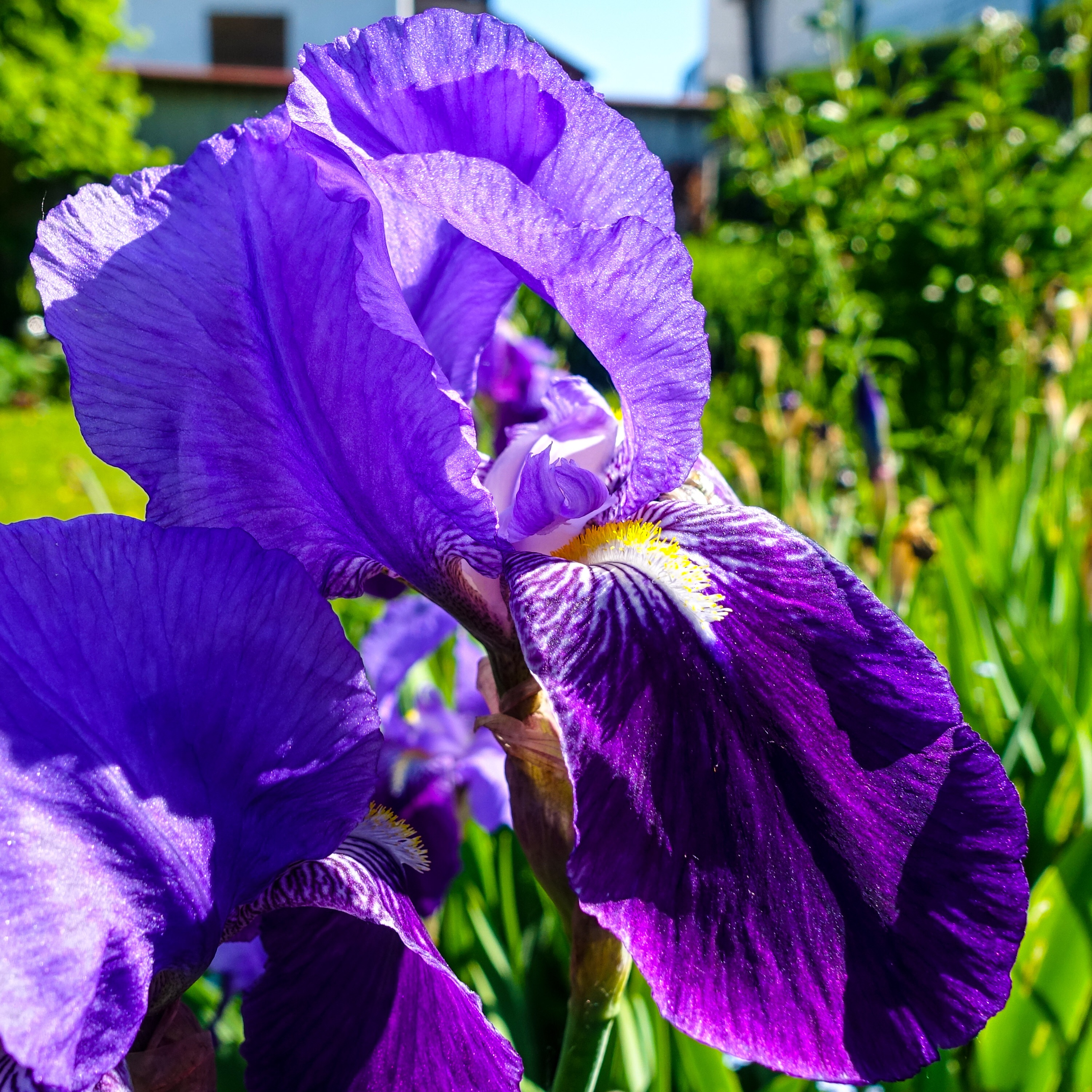

Scientific classification
- Kingdom: Plantae
- Clade: Tracheophytes
- Clade: Angiosperms
- Clade: Monocots
- Order: Asparagales
- Family: Iridaceae
- Genus: Iris
- Subgenus: Iris subg. Iris
- Section: Iris sect. Pogon
- Species: I. × germanica

Binomial name
- Iris × germanica L.

Synonyms
- List: Iris × alba Savi; Iris × amoena Redouté; Iris × atroviolacea Lange; Iris × australis Tod.; Iris × belouinii Bois & Cornuault; Iris × biliottii Foster; Iris × buiana Prodan; Iris × croatica Horvat & M.D.Horvat; Iris × cypriana Foster & Baker; Iris × deflexa Knowles & Westc.; Iris × germanica var. gypsea Rodigas; Iris × glauca Salisb.; Iris × humei G.Don; Iris × laciniata Berg; Iris × latifolia Gilib.; Iris × macrantha Simonet; Iris × mesopotamica Dykes; Iris × murorum Gaterau; Iris × neglecta Hornem.; Iris × nepalensis Wall. ex Lindl.; Iris × nostras Garsault; Iris × nyaradyana Prodan; Iris × pallida Ten.; Iris × redouteana Spach; Iris × repanda Berg; Iris × rothschildii Degen; Iris × sambucina L.; Iris × spectabilis Salisb.; Iris × squalens L.; Iris × superba Berg; Iris × tardiflora Berg; Iris × trojana A.Kern. ex Stapf; Iris × varbossania K.Malý; Iris × venusta J.Booth ex Berg; Iris × violacea Savi; Iris × vulgaris Pohl

= Iris × germanica =

Species of plant

Iris × germanica is the accepted name for a species of flowering plants in the family Iridaceae commonly known as the bearded iris or the German bearded iris. It is of hybrid origin. Varieties include I. × g. var. florentina.

== Description ==
Iris × germanica grows up to 120 cm (47 in) high and 30 cm (12 in) wide. The roots can go up to 10 cm (3.9 in) deep and it is a rhizomatous perennial that blooms mid to late spring. Hundreds of cultivars exist representing nearly every colour from jet black to sparkling whites and red. Some cultivars are known to re-bloom in the autumn (fall).

=== Phytochemistry ===
It is known to produce the isoflavone irilone, and several analytical studies have been made from the rhizomes.

=== Genetics ===
As most irises are diploid, having two sets of chromosomes, this can be used to identify hybrids and classification of groupings. It has had its chromosome counted several times; 2n=44, Banerji & Chaudhuri, 1972; 2n=28, Mao 1986; 2n=44 Sopova 1982; 2n=44, Váchová & Feráková, 1986 and 2n=44, Lovka, 1995.

== Taxonomy ==
It is most commonly known as bearded iris and in the UK occasionally as common German flag.

It was first published and described as Iris germanica by Carl Linnaeus in his book 'Species Plantarum' on page 38 in 1753. It has since been shown to be a natural hybrid involving a cross between two other European species (Iris pallida and Iris variegata) rather than a true wild species of Iris, with both parent species having the same chromosome number (2n = 24) as the hybrid offspring.

As a hybrid, according to correct scientific nomenclature, its official Latin name is Iris x germanica, according to Kew and many other botanical authorities where cross 'x' denotes its hybrid status. Despite this, Iris x germanica and its many named cultivars have been sold to gardeners under the name Iris germanica for many years, with some horticultural references, such as the Royal Horticultural Society (RHS) continuing to use Iris germanica as the accepted name.

== Distribution and habitat ==
Iris × germanica is thought to have originated in the Mediterranean region. It is widely naturalized across Europe.

== Cultivation ==
It prefers to grow in full sun, with well-drained soil. It normally retains some of its leaves over the winter period. After it has flowered and during dry conditions through the summer is best time to divide and transplant.

=== Propagation ===
It can be propagated by seed and by division.

=== Hybrids and cultivars ===
Iris × germanica has many cultivars, there are thought to be about 60,000 cultivars available. These are a few known named cultivars:

- 'Adriatic Shores'
- 'Amas'
- 'Askabadensis'
- 'Baveilles'
- 'Belouinii'
- 'Biliotti'
- 'Black Prince'
- 'Col Du Chat'
- 'Cretan'
- 'Crimson King'
- 'Croatica'
- 'Deflexa'
- 'Dominion'
- 'Dusky Challenger'
- 'Florentina'
- 'Fontarabie'
- 'Germanica'
- 'Germanica Alba'
- 'Germanica Caerulea'
- 'Germanica Major'
- 'Germanica Marmorata'
- 'Germanica Maxima'
- 'Germanica Violacea'
- 'Germanica Vulgaris'
- 'Gnome'
- 'Gypsy Queen'
- 'Istria'
- 'Junonia'
- 'Kharput'
- 'Kirman'
- 'Kochii'
- 'Kurdistan'
- 'Lemperg Purple'
- 'Macrantha'
- 'Nepalensis'
- 'Oriflamme'
- 'Paladin'
- 'Purple King'
- 'Seattle'
- 'Sivas'
- 'Srinagar'
- 'Thun'
- 'Titan's Glory'
- 'Turchino'
- 'Varbosiana'
- 'Varbossana'.

I. × germanica var. amas was one of the most important cultivars in the creation of the modern tetraploid tall-bearded Irises.

In Italy and Thailand, the leaves can be affected by a fungus, Torula masonii.

== In culture ==
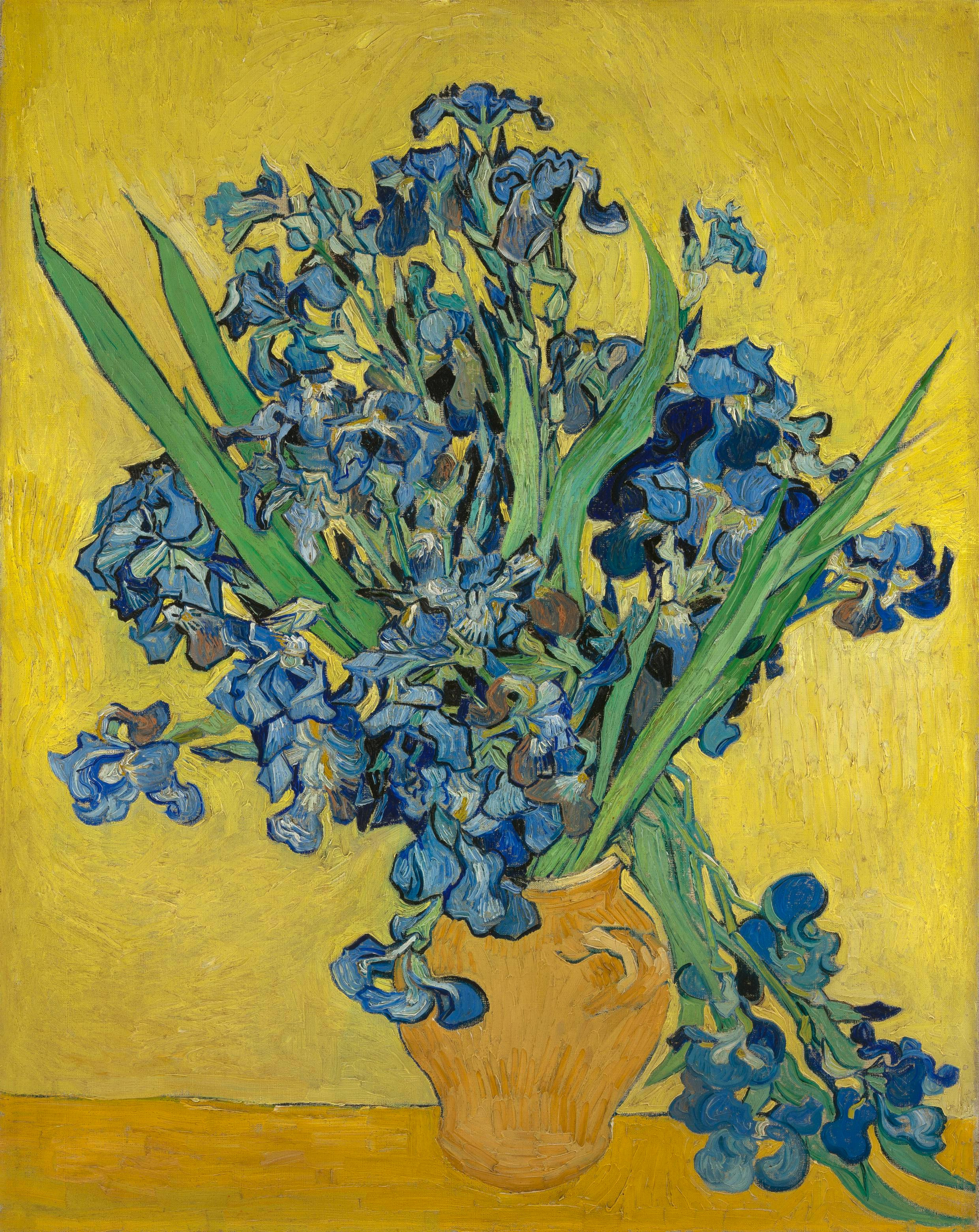
Irises by Vincent van Gogh, 1890

In Iran and Kashmir, Iris kashmiriana and Iris × germanica are commonly grown in Muslim places of burial such as cemeteries.

It has frequently been painted including 'Irises' (see right) and 'Irises' both by Vincent van Gogh in 1890.

== Photo gallery ==
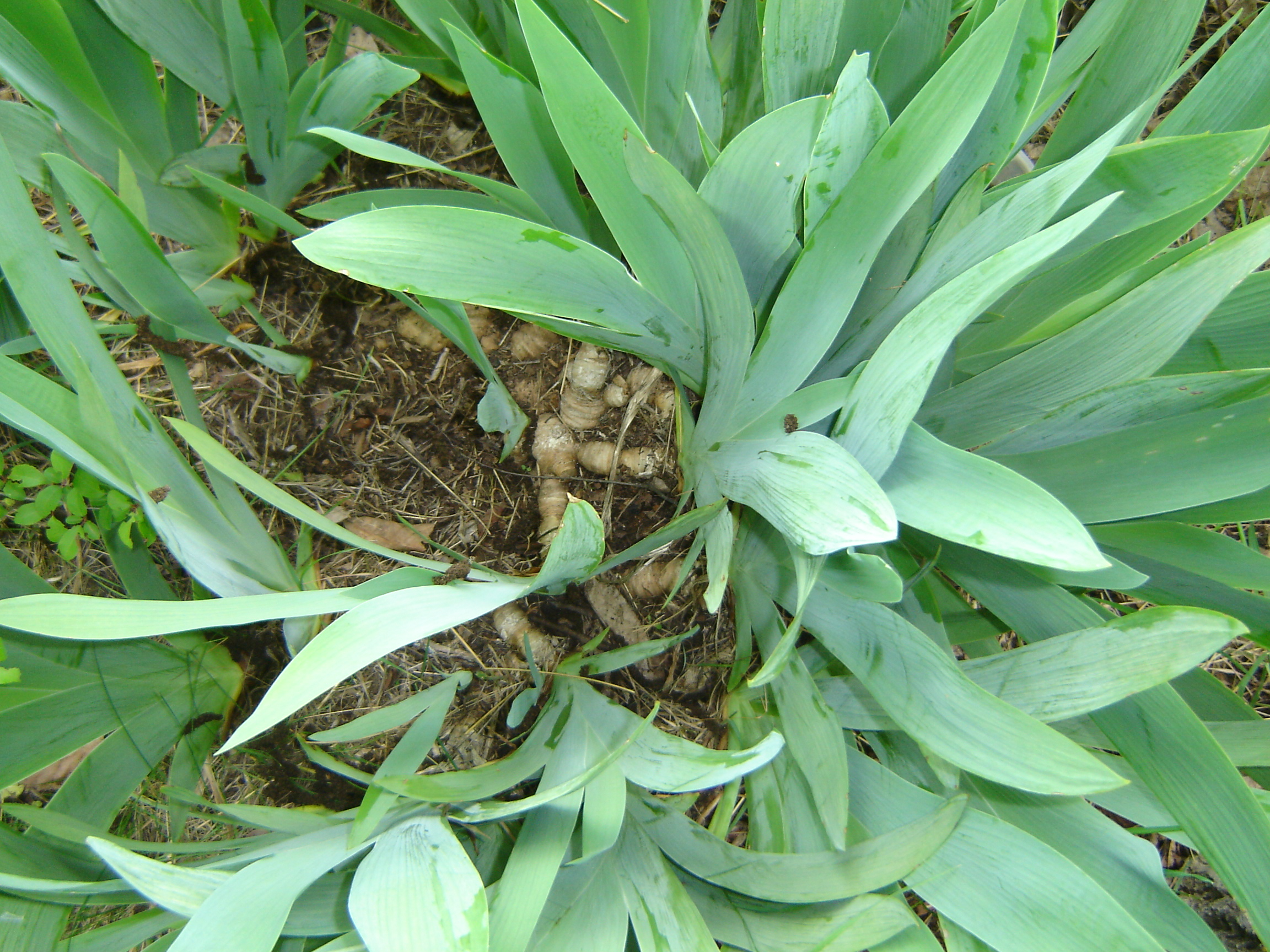
Clonal colony

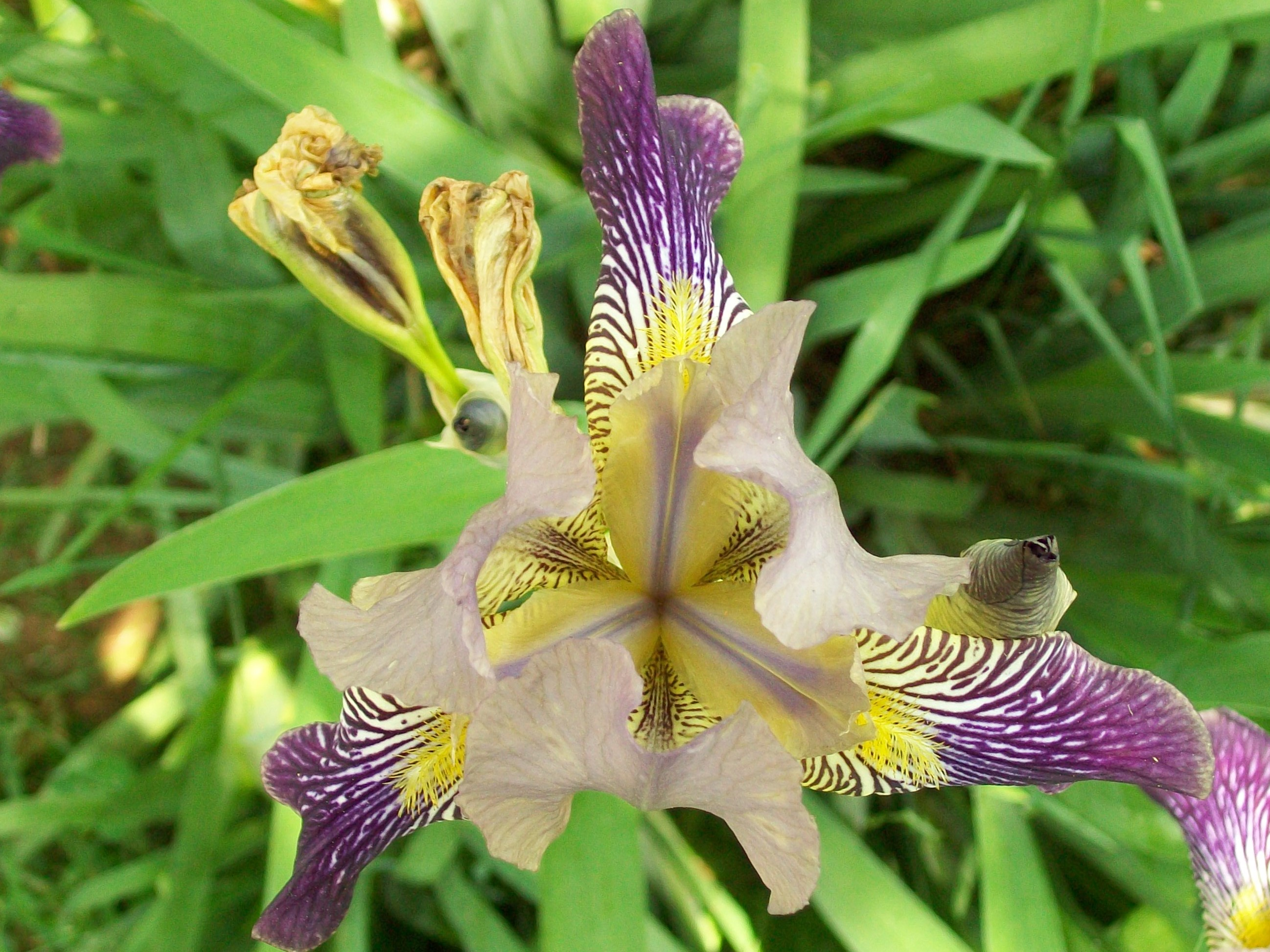
Iris 'Fabian' hybridized by John Salter, 1868, UK

== See also ==
- Orris root

== Sources ==
- Czerepanov, S. K. 1995. Vascular plants of Russia and adjacent states (the former USSR) Cambridge University Press. Note: lists as Iris germanica L.
- Davis, P. H., ed. 1965–1988. Flora of Turkey and the east Aegean islands. Note: lists as Iris germanica L.
- Encke, F. et al. 1993. Zander: Handwörterbuch der Pflanzennamen, 14. Auflage Note: = species
- FNA Editorial Committee. 1993-. Flora of North America. Note: lists as Iris germanica L.
- Komarov, V. L. et al., eds. 1934–1964. Flora SSSR. Note: = Iris germanica L.
- Lampe, K. F. & M. A. McCann. 1985. AMA handbook of poisonous and injurious plants
- Mathew, B. 1981. The Iris. 25–28.
- Nasir, E. & S. I. Ali, eds. 1970-. Flora of [West] Pakistan.
- Personal Care Products Council. INCI
- Rechinger, K. H., ed. 1963-. Flora iranica. Note: lists as Iris germanica L.
- Stace, C. 1995. New flora of the British Isles. Note: natzd.
- Townsend, C. C. & E. Guest. 1966-. Flora of Iraq. Note: = Iris germanica L.
- Tutin, T. G. et al., eds. 1964–1980. Flora europaea. Note: = Iris germanica L.*
- Waddick, J. W. & Zhao Yu-tang. 1992. Iris of China
- Walters, S. M. et al., eds. 1986–2000. European garden flora
