= Iris kuschkensis =

Scientific classification
- Kingdom: Plantae
- Clade: Tracheophytes
- Clade: Angiosperms
- Clade: Monocots
- Order: Asparagales
- Family: Iridaceae
- Genus: Iris
- Subgenus: Iris subg. Iris
- Section: Iris sect. Regelia
- Species: I. kuschkensis

Binomial name
- Iris kuschkensis Grey-Wilson & B.Mathew

Synonyms
- No synonyms known

Species of plant

Iris kuschkensis is a species in the genus Iris, it is also in the subgenus Iris and in the section Regelia. It is a rhizomatous perennial, from Afghanistan. It has blue brown, or purple to purple bronze flowers, with a pale purple beard. It is rarely cultivated as an ornamental plant in temperate regions.

== Description ==
It is similar in form to Iris darwasica, another Regelia section iris. It can grow up to between 30–50 cm (12–20 in) tall.

It is early flowering. It has 2 or 3, blue brown, or purple to purple bronze flowers. It also has a pale purple beard.

=== Biochemistry ===
As most irises are diploid, having two sets of chromosomes, this can be used to identify hybrids and classification of groupings. It has not been revealed what is the count of the iris.

== Taxonomy ==
The Latin specific epithet kuschkensis refers to Kazak, Turkestan. It is also a Russian version of the village of Serhetabat in Turkmenistan. It is also used by Tulipa kuschkensis as well, collected from the same area.

It was first published and described by Grey-Wilson and B.Mathew in the Kew Bulletin Vol.29 page 67 on 27 June 1974.

It is sometimes classified as synonym of Iris lineata.

It was verified by United States Department of Agriculture and the Agricultural Research Service on 4 April 2003 and then updated on 3 December 2004.

== Distribution and habitat ==
Iris kuschkensis is native to temperate areas of central Asia.

=== Range ===
It is found in Afghanistan, in Herat Province.

== Sources ==
- Mathew, B. 1981. The Iris. 63–64.
- Rechinger, K. H., ed. 1963–. Flora iranica.
