= Iris swensoniana =

Scientific classification
- Kingdom: Plantae
- Clade: Tracheophytes
- Clade: Angiosperms
- Clade: Monocots
- Order: Asparagales
- Family: Iridaceae
- Genus: Iris
- Subgenus: Iris subg. Iris
- Section: Iris sect. Oncocyclus
- Species: I. swensoniana

Binomial name
- Iris swensoniana (Chaudhary), G.Kirkw. & C.Weymouth

Synonyms
- None known

Species of plant

Iris swensoniana is a species in the genus Iris, it is also in the subgenus of Iris and in the Oncocyclus section. It grows in the deserts of Syria. It has blue-green curved leaves, tall stems holding purple-black or purple blooms with a yellow beard and maroon-black signal patch.

== Description ==
Iris swensoniana has very small rhizomes.

The plant can reach up to 20–45 cm (8–18 in) tall, normally about 40 cm. It has falcate (meaning cutlass-shaped) or very curved leaves, that are blue-green in colour.

It has blooms which are 7–8 cm (3–3 in) in diameter.

Like other irises, it has two pairs of petals: three large sepals (outer petals), known as the 'falls', and three inner, smaller petals (or tepals), known as the 'standards'. The upright standards are paler than the falls, in shades of light purple, or purple. The drooping falls are blackish purple, and in the middle of the petal is a signal patch which is even darker, in shades of dark maroon-black. The middle fall also has a row of tiny hairs called 'the beard' which are yellow tipped with purple, or black-purple.

After the iris has flowered, it produces a seed capsule that has not been recorded.

== Taxonomy ==
The Latin specific epithet swensoniana may refer to Swedish botanist Ulf Swenson (1959-) who has published around 153 botanic names.

It was found in 1975, in Tell Chahan area of Syria), and it was first published and described by Shaukat Chaudhary, Grace Kirkwood and Carolyne Weymouth in Botaniska Notiser (Bot. Not.), Vol.128 (Issue 4) on page 406 (written in 1975 then published in 1976).

It was verified as Iris swensoniana by United States Department of Agriculture and the Agricultural Research Service on 4 April 2003 and then changed on 3 December 2004.

Some sources claim that Iris barnumae var. zenobiae is a synonym of I. swensoniana, others including state that I. barnumae var. zenobiae is a synonym of Iris assadiana, another Syrian desert iris with dark flowers published by the same 3 authors.

== Distribution and habitat ==
It is native to temperate Asia.

=== Range ===
It is found in Syria.

=== Habitat ===
It grows in the desert.

== Cultivation ==
It is thought to be quite difficult to cultivate, as it needs a fertile compost (with enough nutrients to form blooms) but with good drainage and water (enough to survive) but not too much to rot.

== Toxicity ==
Like many other irises, most parts of the plant are poisonous (including rhizome and leaves), if mistakenly ingested, it can cause stomach pains and vomiting. Also handling the plant may cause a skin irritation or an allergic reaction.

== Other sources ==
- Mathew, B. The Iris. 1981 (Iris) 60.
