= Iris yebrudii =

Conservation status
- Data Deficient (IUCN 3.1)

Scientific classification
- Kingdom: Plantae
- Clade: Embryophytes
- Clade: Tracheophytes
- Clade: Spermatophytes
- Clade: Angiosperms
- Clade: Monocots
- Order: Asparagales
- Family: Iridaceae
- Genus: Iris
- Subgenus: Iris subg. Iris
- Section: Iris sect. Oncocyclus
- Species: I. yebrudii

Binomial name
- Iris yebrudii Dinsm. ex Chaudhary

Synonyms
- Iris yebrudii subsp. yebrudii

Species of plant

Iris yebrudii is a species in the genus Iris, it is also in the subgenus of Iris and in the Oncocyclus section. It is from the hillsides of Syria. It has curved leaves, often hiding a single stem and the spring flower is pale yellow, covered in fine spots, veining and has a dark purple signal patch and purple beard.

== Description ==
Iris yebrudii has a small and compact rhizome, with approximately 5-8 leaves which are 21 cm (8 in) long and up to 1 cm wide. They are often strongly falcate, (sickle shaped) with a grey-white bloom on their surface. It has a stem which is about 15–18 cm (6–7 in) tall, and usually hidden by the leaves. In cultivation they grow up to 30 cm (12 in) tall. It blooms in May and the flowers are 13 cm (5 in) in diameter. Like other irises, it has 2 pairs of petals, 3 large sepals (outer petals), known as the 'falls' and 3 inner, smaller petals (or tepals), known as the 'standards'. The standards are slightly paler than the falls, they have a pale yellow ground with fine purple veins and dots on top. They are orbicular shaped and 7.5 cm (3 in) long and 6.5 cm wide. The oval to obovate shaped falls are 7 cm (3 in) long and 5 cm wide. They have a yellow ground and have veining and are speckled, brown purple, or dark brown. In the middle of the falls is a 1 cm in diameter, signal patch which is dark purple. There is also a row of tiny hairs called the 'beard', which are purple, it comes from the base of the petal towards the signal patch.

It produces a seedpod after it has finished flowering, this has not been published.

=== Genetics ===
As most irises are diploid, having two sets of chromosomes. This can be used to identify hybrids and classification of groupings. It has a chromosome count of 2n=20.

== Taxonomy ==
The Latin specific epithet yebrudii refers to the Syrian city of Yabroud which is also spelled as Yabrud or Yebrud.

It was originally found in Yebrud, Syria by John Edward Dinsmore as Iris yebrudi and then published by Paul Mouterde in 1966 in his book Nouvelle flore du Liban et de la Syrie Vol 1. After determining it was a distinct species Shaukat Ali Chaudhary published a description of the iris as Iris yebrudii in Botaniska Notiser (Bot. Not.) Vol.125 on page 259 in 1972.

Occasionally, it is still misspelled as Iris yebrudi (with one i at the end).

It was verified by United States Department of Agriculture and the Agricultural Research Service on 4 April 2003.

=== Iris yebrudii subsp. edgecombii ===
There is thought to be a subspecies of Iris yebrudii, called edgecombii Chaudh. which was found in central Syria in the Kastel area. It differs from the main species, in having larger flowers, and has more reddish purple shades. It also flowers later in April. The petals are longer, with the white, standards up to 10 cm long, and veined in maroon. The pale yellow or greenish, falls are 9 cm long, and veined and dotted with reddish-purple. It has maroon-purple signal patch.

But a lot of sources have classed it as a synonym.

== Distribution and habitat ==
It is native to temperate Asia.

=== Range ===
It is endemic to Syria. and found in the Yebrud area, between Damascus and Homs.

One reference mentions Lebanon, but this is probably an old reference referring to a different iris.

=== Habitat ===
It grows on largely bare, rocky or stony hillsides.

== Conservation ==
The plant is classed by Chaudhary to be rare and in danger of extinction, but it is unassessed by the IUCN.

== Ecology ==
Males of certain species of bumblebee are known to roost in the centre of the flowers overnight, to await the arrival of the females in the morning.

== Toxicity ==
Like many other irises, most parts of the plant are poisonous (rhizome and leaves), if mistakenly ingested can cause stomach pains and vomiting. Also handling the plant may cause a skin irritation or an allergic reaction.

== Other sources ==
- Alholani, A.-A. 2012. Descriptive and molecular studies of wild Iris species in the Syrian flora. University of Damascus.
- Chaudhary, S.A., Kirkwood, G. and Weymouth, C. 1975. The Iris subgenus Susiana in Lebanon and Syria. Botaniska notiser 128(4): 380-407.
- Innes, C. 1985. The World of Iridaceae: 1-407. Holly Gare International Ltd., Ashington
