= Iris heweri =

Scientific classification
- Kingdom: Plantae
- Clade: Tracheophytes
- Clade: Angiosperms
- Clade: Monocots
- Order: Asparagales
- Family: Iridaceae
- Genus: Iris
- Subgenus: Iris subg. Iris
- Section: Iris sect. Regelia
- Species: I. heweri

Binomial name
- Iris heweri Grey-Wilson & B.Mathew

Synonyms
- No synonyms known

Species of flowering plant

Iris heweri is a plant species in the genus Iris, it is also in the subgenus Iris and in the section Regelia. It is a rhizomatous perennial, from Afghanistan. It has tall, green curved leaves, tall slender stems and purple blue or violet-blue flowers, with white and purple or lilac beard. It is cultivated as an ornamental plant in temperate regions.

== Description ==
It is similar in form to Iris falcifolia (in the Hexapogon Section) but differs in having a looser rhizome system and the leaves are also different.

It has a small and slender rhizome, that is 0.5 cm in diameter. It has several stolons (branches), that are between 1–5 cm long. On top of the rhizome, are the fibrous remains of last seasons leaves.

It has 4–7, grey-green, or green leaves. They are falcate (or sickle shaped), with membranous margins. The leaves can grow up to 14–15 cm (6–6 in) long, they are shorter (than the flowering stem) at the time of blooming. They are between 0.2 – 0.5 cm wide.

It has a stem that can grow up to between 10–15 cm (4–6 in) tall, but occasionally they can reach up to 30 cm (12 in) tall.

The stem has spathes (leaves of the flower bud), that are 3–7 cm (1–3 in) long. The stems hold 1–3 terminal (top of stem) flowers, blooming late spring, or May.

The flowers are 5 cm (2 in) in diameter, come in shades of purple blue, or violet-blue flowers

It has 2 pairs of petals, 3 large sepals (outer petals), known as the 'falls' and 3 inner, smaller petals (or tepals), known as the 'standards'. The falls are elliptic and oblanceolate shaped and 3.5–4.5 cm (1–2 in) long, and between 1.25–1.5 cm wide. It has a sharply reflexed blade and dense central beard of white hairs, which are tipped in purple or lilac. The haft (section closest to the stem) is whitish veined with purple. The erect standards are narrowly obovate and 3.5–4.5 cm (1–2 in) long, and between 1–1.25 cm wide. It has a cuneate (wedge shaped) haft with sparse beard extending onto blade.

It has a 1.5 cm long perianth tube and a 1.4 cm long pale purple style, that is elliptical (in shaped) and has slightly wavy margins. It is also tri-lobed and the lobs are triangular and 0.9 cm long. It has a 0.5 cm long white filament, 1.1–1.3 cm long anthers and creamy white pollen.

After the iris has flowered, it produces a seed capsule, which is 3.5 cm long and 1.5 cm wide. It has a short pedicel and the remains of the perianth tube can still be found at the top of the capsule. Inside, are 0.4 cm long and 0.25 cm wide, dark brown seeds, which are rough coated with white aril (appendage).

=== Biochemistry ===
As most irises are diploid, having two sets of chromosomes, this can be used to identify hybrids and classification of groupings. It has a chromosome count: 2n = 22

== Taxonomy ==
The Latin specific epithet heweri refers to Professor Thomas Frederick Hewer (born 12 April 1903 - 15 March 1994), who became a practising pathologist in 1935. He was then appointed senior lecturer in pathology at the University of Liverpool. When he retired in 1959, he went on several plant hunting expeditions to the Alps, Eastern Europe, Turkey, Iran and Afghanistan. He collected over 4800 specimens (pressed and living). These new found plants were given to the botanical gardens at Kew, Edinburgh and Cambridge. He also discovered 20 new plant species, three of which; Iris heweri, Acantholimon heweri and Bellavalia heweri, were later named after him.

Specimens of Iris heweri were originally collected by Prof Hewer in 1969.

It was first published and described by Grey-Wilson and Mathew in Kew Bulletin Vol.29, page67 on 27 June 1974.

It was also published in the 'Iris Year Book', pages106 and 117 in 1973.

An illustration of the iris, was published in the 'Journal of the Royal Horticultural Society' Vol.99, page87 in 1974.

It was verified by United States Department of Agriculture and the Agricultural Research Service on 4 April 2003, then updated on 2 December 2004.

Iris heweri is an accepted name by the RHS.

== Distribution and habitat ==
It is native to temperate Asia.

=== Range ===
It is found in Afghanistan.

It is found within several Provinces of Afghanistan, in Baghlan Province, Balkh Province and Zabul Province.

=== Habitat ===
It grows on alpine meadows, screes, grassy and sandy slopes.

They can be found at an altitude of 1,100–2,200 metres (3,600–7,200 ft) above sea level.

== Cultivation ==
It is hardy to European Zone H4, in most other areas, it can be grown in an alpine house or bulb frame.

It prefers to grow in well-drained soils, in sunny situations.

It is rarely found in nurseries.
