= Iris longiscapa =

Scientific classification
- Kingdom: Plantae
- Clade: Tracheophytes
- Clade: Angiosperms
- Clade: Monocots
- Order: Asparagales
- Family: Iridaceae
- Genus: Iris
- Subgenus: Iris subg. Iris
- Section: Iris sect. Hexapogon
- Species: I. longiscapa

Binomial name
- Iris longiscapa Ledeb.

Synonyms
- Iris filifolia Bunge (Illegitimate)

Species of flowering plant

Iris longiscapa is a plant species in the genus Iris, it is also in the subgenus Iris and in the section Hexapogon. It is a rhizomatous perennial from the deserts of Kazakhstan, Tajikistan, Turkmenistan and Uzbekistan. They have grass-like leaves and lilac-violet or blue-purple flowers on a tall slender stem.

It is cultivated as an ornamental plant in temperate regions.

== Description ==
Iris longiscapa is very similar in form to Iris songarica.

The plant has a short, small rhizome. It produces small, nut-like segments, (which are smaller than Iris falcifolia), one per year, that spread to create small creeping, dense tufts of plants. On top of the rhizome are the fibrous remains of the previous seasons leaves. Underneath, it has plenty of thick roots.

It has basal, green, grass-like or filiform (thread-like) linear leaves. They are narrow, deciduous and between 0.02–25 cm (0–10 in) wide. The leaves are much narrower and straighter than Iris falcifolia.

The stem (or peduncle) is slender and can grow between 50–75 cm (20–30 in) long. It is more longer and slender than Iris falcifolia, but shorter than Iris songarica.

The stems have 3 spathes (leaves of the flower bud), which are narrow and are acuminated (ending in a sharp point), and they have a hyaline (clear and translucent) or membranous margin. The spathes have a small peduncle (stalk) that are between 1.2–2.5 cm (0–1 in) long.

The stems hold short pedicels (flower stalks), which are 5–7.5 cm (2–3 in) long, they hold 2–5 flowers, between April and May.

The flowers are 4–5 cm (2–2 in) in diameter, they are slightly smaller than Iris falcifolia, but smaller than Iris songarica. They come in shades of lilac-violet, or blue-purple, It has 2 pairs of petals, 3 large sepals (outer petals), known as the 'falls' and 3 inner, smaller petals (or tepals), known as the 'standards'. The falls are oblong shaped, and have darker veins along the margins. In the centre of the falls, is a large, white, clavate (shaped like a club) beard. It has a fine yellow centre. The standards are erect, narrowly spatulate and can sometimes have hairs.

The flowers are bisexual and actinomorphic (meaning have radial symmetry).

After the iris has flowered, it produces a pointed, 3-angled, or 3-edged seed capsule that is 4–6 cm (2–2 in) long.

=== Biochemistry ===
Since most irises are diploid, having two sets of chromosomes, this can be used to identify hybrids and classification of groupings. It has a chromosome count: 2n=18, carried out by Zakharyeva in 1985.

== Taxonomy ==
It is known locally as 'teke-sakal (in Turkmenistan) and kacathk (in Uzbekistan).

The Latin specific epithet longiscapa refers to long, slender stem, or long scape.

It was first published and described by Carl Friedrich von Ledebour in 'Flora Rossica sive Enumeratio Plantarum in Totius Imperii Rossici Provinciis Europaeis, Asiaticis, et Americanis Hucusque Observatarum. Stuttgartiae' (Fl. Ross.) Vol.4 Issue 12, page 93 in April 1852.

It was also published in 'Mém. Acad. Imp. Sci. St.-Pétersbourg Divers Savans' Vol.7 page 505 in 1854. The synonym Iris filifolia Boiss. was published in 'Voy. Espagne' (1839–45) page602 in 1839.

It has never been illustrated except for a small drawing of one flower published in Komarov's 'Flora USSR' in Vol.4, table 34 in 1935.

On 2 October 2014, it was verified by the United States Department of Agriculture and the Agricultural Research Service.

== Distribution and habitat ==
Iris longiscapa is a native to temperate regions of Central Asia.

=== Range ===
It is found in (the former states of USSR), of Kazakhstan, Afghanistan, Tajikistan, Turkmenistan, and Uzbekistan. It is also found in Iran, or the Turanian deserts.

They are specifically found in the deserts of Kara Kum and Kyzyl Kum.

=== Habitat ===
It is a psammophyte and grows in the sandy-clay deserts, or on granite hills. The soils contain NoH.

It is also found in the Turanian gypsophilic (gypsum-loving) sagebrush lands of Kazakhstan, growing with Gagea reticulata, Nonea caspica and Tulipa sogdiana.

== Uses ==
A harvest of dry leaves of the iris are used as a litter for cattle in barns in Uzbekistan.

It is eaten in spring by sheep in .

=== Cultivation ===
Iris longiscapa is cultivated as an ornamental plant, though it is rare.

It is not hardy in Europe, and should be grown in a pot or a cold greenhouse. It is grown in loamy soils, in full sun with good drainage. It needs to rest and be dry over summer, after it flowers. It needs to be grown in full sun.

A specimen was sent to Saint Petersburg Botanical Garden.
