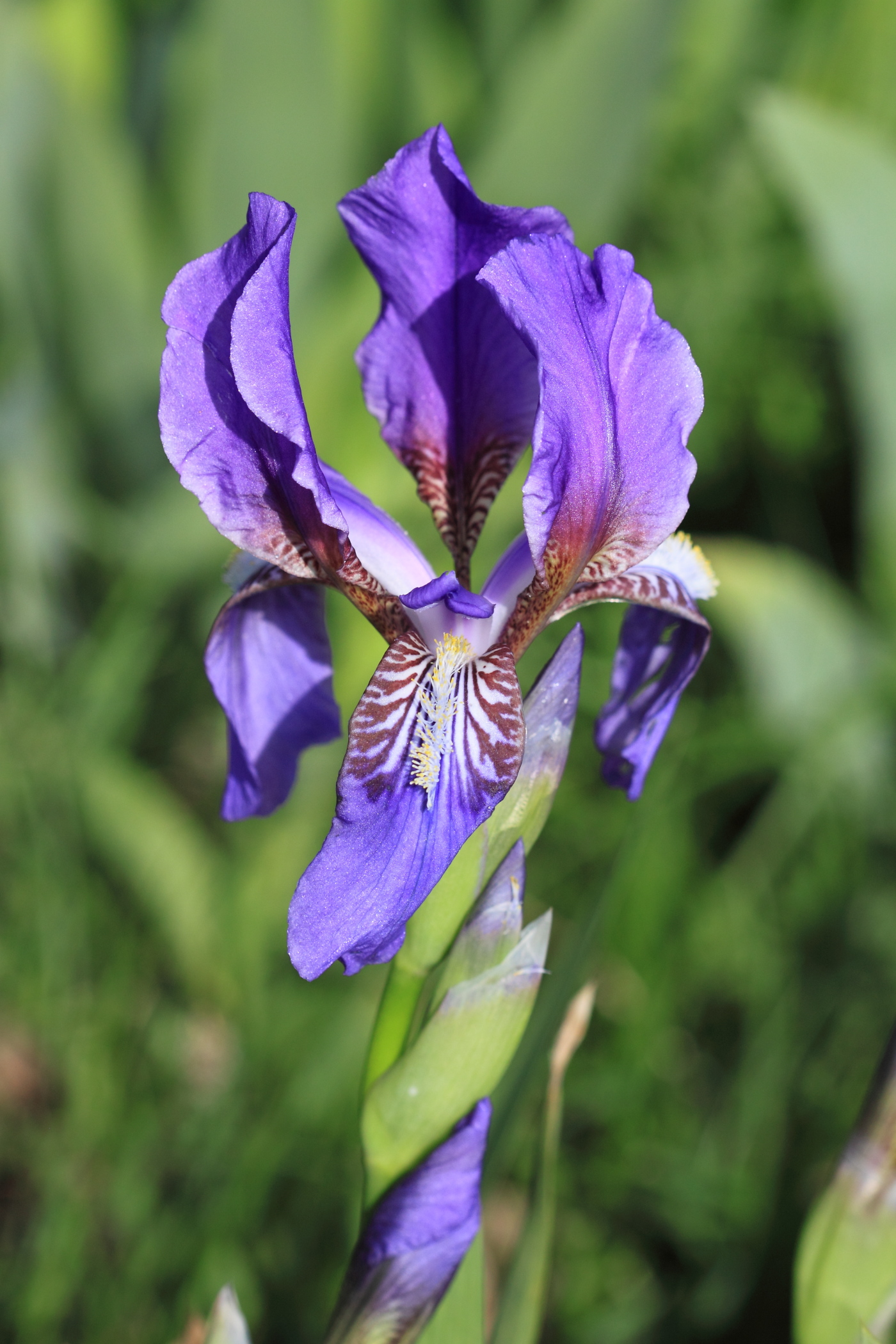

Scientific classification
- Kingdom: Plantae
- Clade: Tracheophytes
- Clade: Angiosperms
- Clade: Monocots
- Order: Asparagales
- Family: Iridaceae
- Genus: Iris
- Subgenus: Iris subg. Iris
- Section: Iris sect. Pogon
- Species: I. albertii

Binomial name
- Iris albertii Regel

= Iris albertii =

Species of flowering plant

Iris albertii is a species of iris found in Central Asia. It grows in the wild on grassy steppes at an elevation of 200 to 2000 meters, in sunny or semi-shaded locations. It is a member of the subgenus iris, meaning that it is a bearded iris, and grows from a rhizome.

It grows to a stem height of 40 to 50 centimeters. The leaves are bluish-green in color, and sword-shaped, 40 to 50 centimeters in length, and 2.5 to 3 centimeters in width. The inflorescence, produced in May, is fan-shaped and contains two or three flowers. The plant often reflowers in the fall. The blooms produced are lavender to purple-violet, and veined with brownish-red, with whitish or pale blue beards. The blooms last for two to three weeks.

== Propagation ==
Irises can generally be propagated by division, or by seed growing.

== Toxicity ==
Like many other irises, most parts of the plant are poisonous (rhizome and leaves), and if mistakenly ingested can cause stomach pains and vomiting. Also, handling the plant may cause skin irritation or an allergic reaction.
