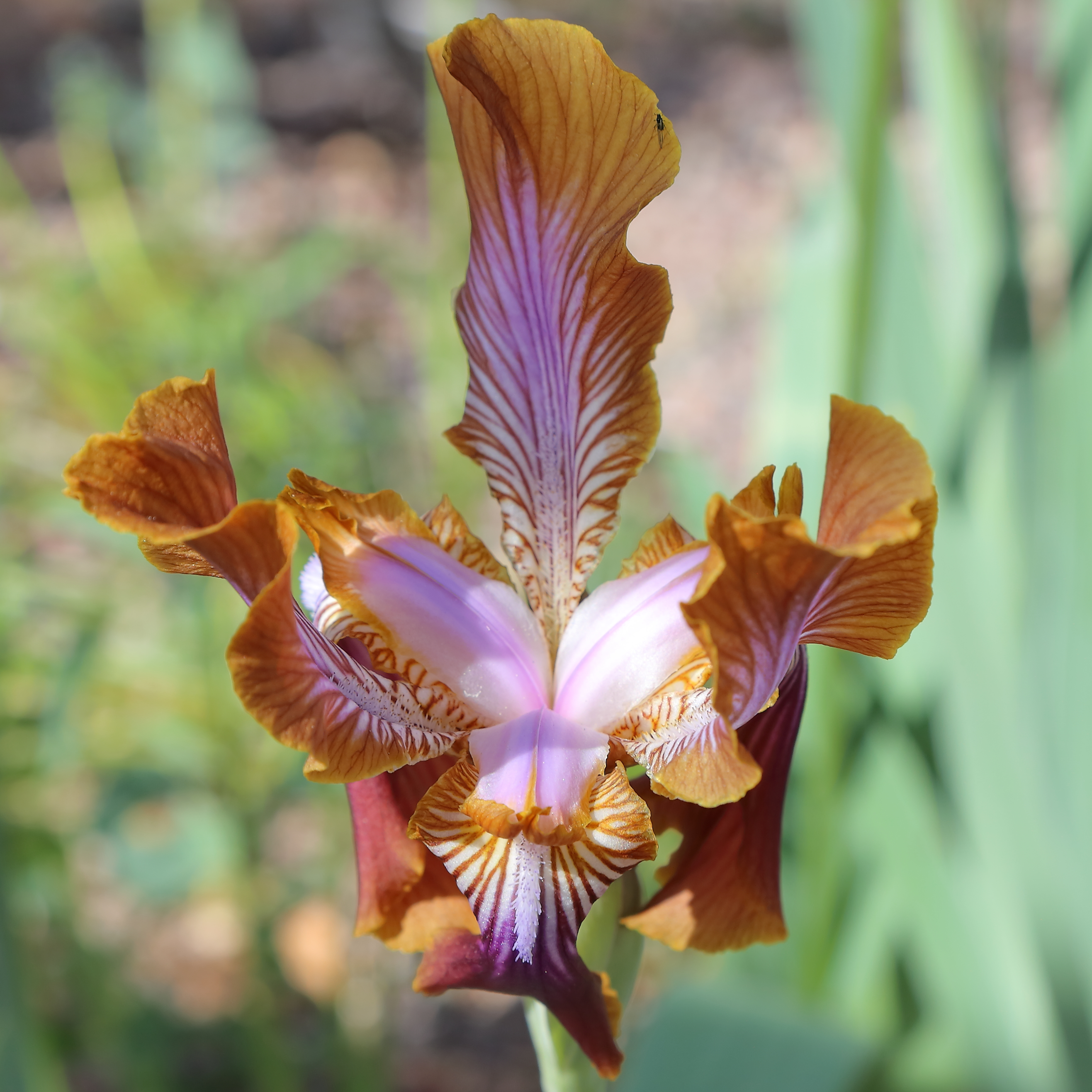

Scientific classification
- Kingdom: Plantae
- Clade: Tracheophytes
- Clade: Angiosperms
- Clade: Monocots
- Order: Asparagales
- Family: Iridaceae
- Genus: Iris
- Subgenus: Iris subg. Iris
- Section: Iris sect. Regelia
- Species: I. stolonifera

Binomial name
- Iris stolonifera Maxim.

Synonyms
- Iris leichtlinii Regel

= Iris stolonifera =

Species of plant

Iris stolonifera is a plant species in the genus Iris; it is also in the subgenus Iris, and in the section Regelia. It is a rhizomatous perennial, from the mountains of Turkestan, between Tajikistan, Uzbekistan and Afghanistan. It has red-skinned stolon roots and rhizomes, glaucous, long, blue-grey leaves, and bi-coloured flowers, in various shades from milky white, to blue, purple, pale lilac, lavender, and brown. It normally has blue to yellow beards on all the petals.

== Description ==
It has a rhizome, that in the spring, sends out thin, and long, (up to 20 cm (8 in) long,) secondary roots (or stolons), which have a red skin. At the end of each stolon, it forms a new rhizome, creating widespread colonies of plants. Other 'Regelia section' irises also have stolons. Also Iris japonica, Iris prismatica and Iris henryi produce stolons.

It has dark blue-green, or glaucous leaves. They are sword-shaped, and 30–60 cm (12–24 in) long, and 0.8 cm to 2 cm wide. They are prominently veined, and semi-evergreen, disappearing after summer, after the blooming period is over.

It has a stem, that can grow up to between 30–60 cm (12–24 in) tall, or 40–60 cm (16–24 in) tall.

The stem has (scarious) membranous, spathes or bracts (leaves of the flower bud), which are 6.5 cm (3 in) long.

The stems hold 2–3 terminal (top of stem) flowers, blooming in late spring, between April and June, or May, or between May and June.

The scented, flowers are 7–8 cm (3–3 in) in diameter.

They are variable in colour, normally bi-coloured, ranging from milky white, to blue, to purple, (or pale lilac, or lavender,) and brown. They normally have a blue (or pale lilac,) centre with a brown, or reddish-bronze, or yellow margin.

It has two pairs of petals, three large sepals (outer petals), known as the 'falls' and three inner, smaller petals (or tepals), known as the 'standards'. The falls are 6–8 cm (2–3 in) long, and 2.5–3.5 cm (1–1 in) wide. The standards are 6.5 cm (3 in) long, and 3 cm (1 in) wide. Each petal has a beard. Which is also variable, normally blue, or yellow, or between blue and yellow, Also lilac, and cream beards have been found.

It has a brown, 2.5 cm long perianth tube, which is funnel shaped. It has 3 cm long styles, which are variable in colour. It has cream or blue coloured pollen.

After the iris has flowered, between May and July, it produces an oblong seed capsule, that is 6–8 cm (2–3 in) long. It is slightly inflated, and tapers at both ends. Inside the capsule, are light brown seeds that have thick white aril (coatings).

=== Genetics ===
As most irises, this species is diploid, having two sets of chromosomes. This can be used to identify hybrids and classification of groupings. It has a chromosome count: 2n=44.

== Taxonomy ==
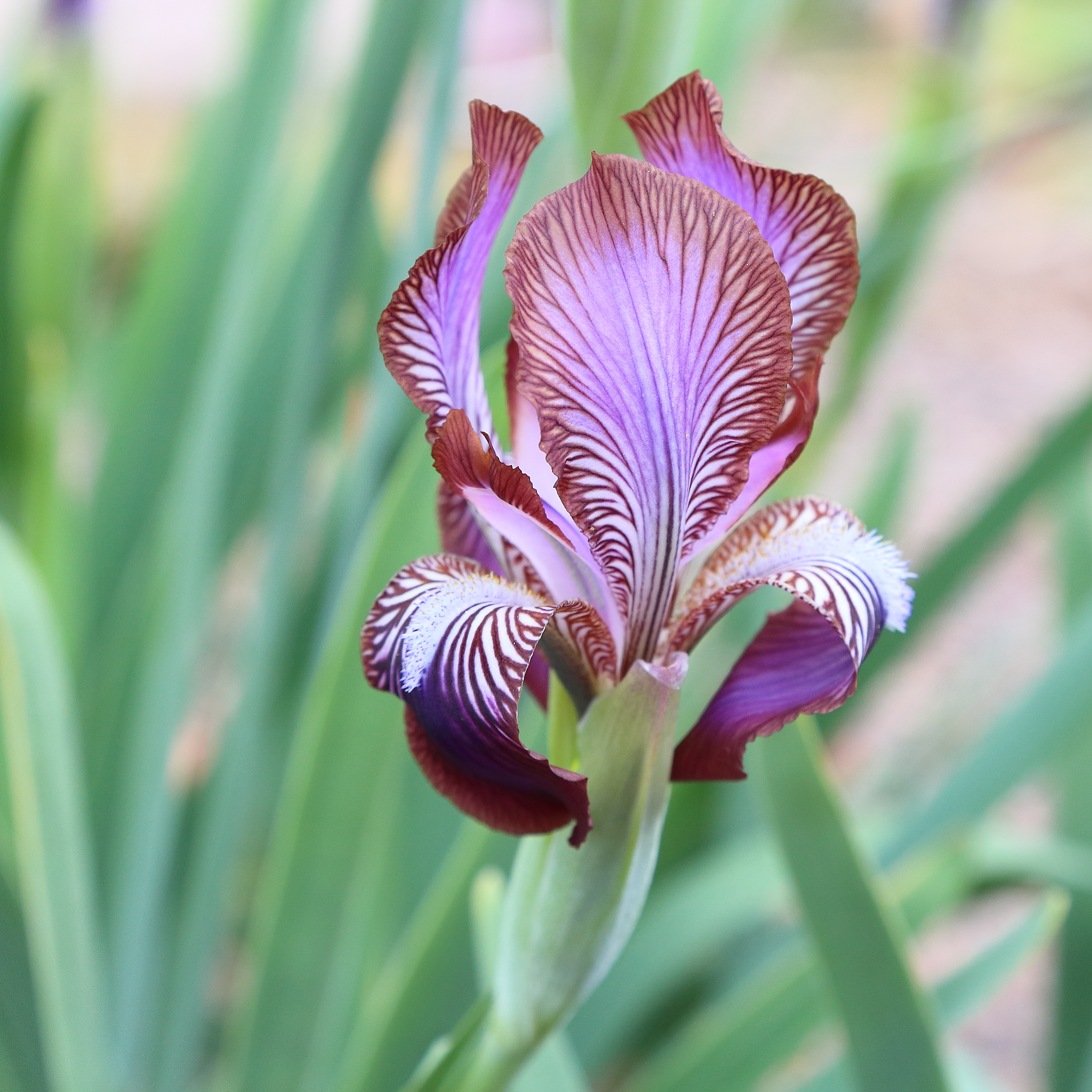

It has the common names of 'Pamiriris'.

It is known as 'Pobegonosy Iris' in Russia.

The Latin specific epithet stolonifera derives from its thin stolon-like roots. (See description for more details.)

It was first collected by Olga Fedtschenko in around 1870,

It was first published and described by Karl Maximovich in the 'Bull. Acad. Imp. Sci. Saint-Pétersbourg' Vol.26 on page 535 in 1880. It was also published in 'Mélanges Biol. Bull. Phys.-Math. Acad. Imp. Sci. Saint-Pétersbourg' (Diagn. pl. nov. asiat. or 'Diagnoses Plantarum Asiaticarum') Vol. 10 on page 731 in 1880.

It was also published with an illustration in Curtis's Botanical Magazine 7861 in 1902, and in Hort. Vol. 7 Issue 8 page 191 on 15 April 1929.

Iris stolonifera is an accepted name by the RHS, and it was verified by United States Department of Agriculture and the Agricultural Research Service on 2 October 2014.

== Distribution and habitat ==
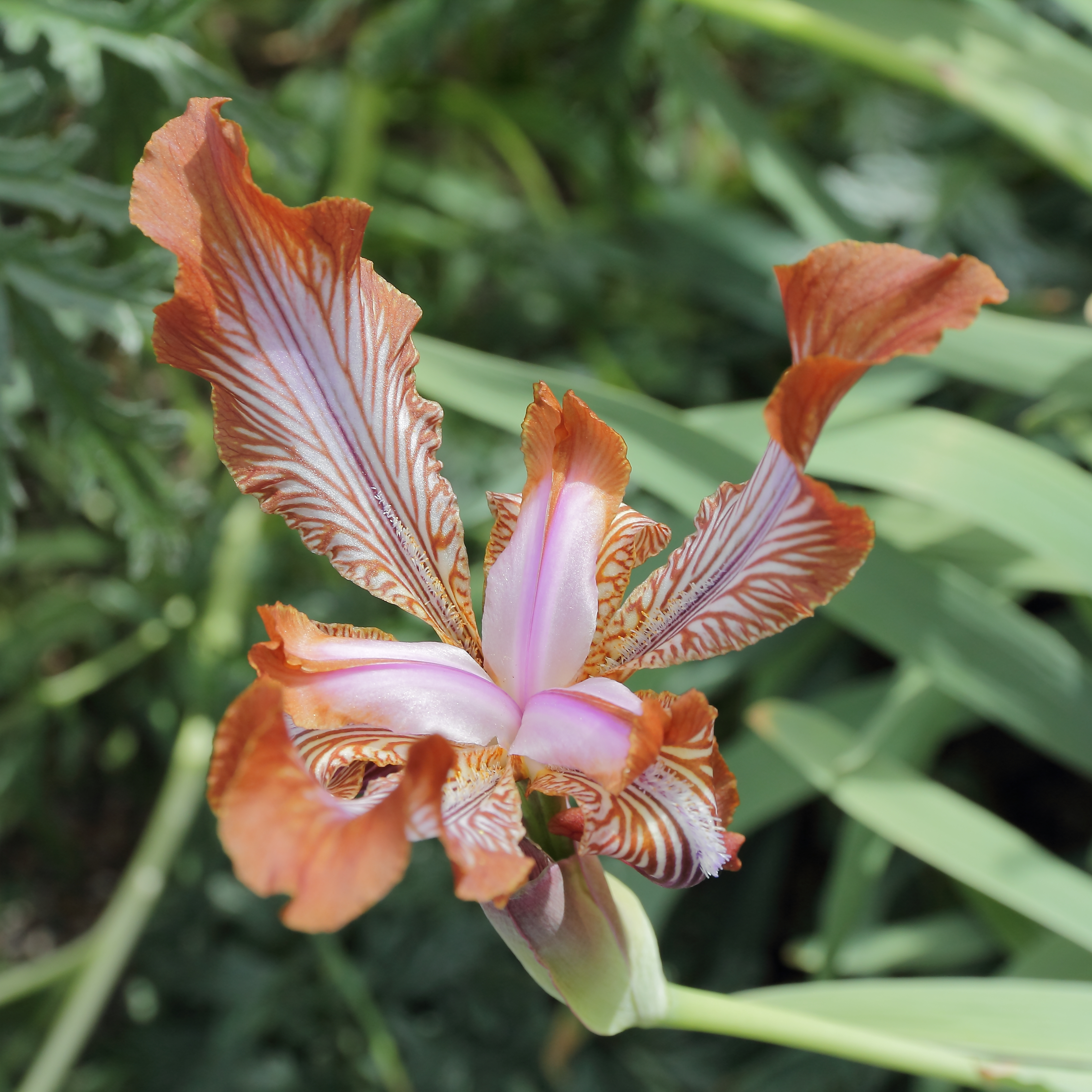

Iris stolonifera is native to temperate areas of central Asia.

=== Range ===
It is found in the mountain ranges of the Pamir Alai (or Alay), (including the Gissar Range, and Saravschan Range,). which passes through the former Russian (or Soviet), country of Turkestan. (including near Bokhara,)

It is also found in Tajikistan, (from the city of Dushanbe, to Uzbekistan, (including near the city of Samarkand near the Baysun ridge, and in the 'Kitab Zapovednik' (Geoological) reserve in the Kashkadarya Province,) and in Afghanistan.

=== Habitat ===
It grows on dry rock slopes, along dry creeks, and upland meadows.

One reference (Flora of S.S.S.R.) mentions wet meadows and stream sides, also mentioned by the British Iris Society Guide, but herbarium specimens do not support this habitat, also the other irises in the Regelia section are also mountainside irises.

They can be found at an altitude of 800 to 2,400 m (2,600 to 7,900 ft) above sea level.

== Cultivation ==
It is very cold hardy, to USDA Zone 5, or between Zone 5 to Zone 8. It is also hardy in Europe to Zone H3. In very cold areas, such as Russia, the plant may die out after 2 or 3 years.

It prefers to grow in well-drained soils, which are rich in humus. It can tolerate soils with a ph level of 6.8.

It prefers positions in full sun. It needs a dormant dry period (or drought) during the summer.

The plants are not tolerant of winds.

In non-hardy places, it is best grown in a bulb frame. It can be also grown in rock garden.

The plants should be planted at a depth of 2 inches, in October.

It is thought to be one of the easiest 'Regelia' section irises to cultivate, as it is more adaptable and vigorous than others.

=== Hybrids and cultivars ===
Iris stolonifera has been crossed with Iris korolkowii to create different coloured hybrids that have dark brown or deep blue beards. It has been crossed with other irises but did not produce very suitable crosses.

There are several different cultivars, including 'Chocolate', 'Decorated Blue Beard', 'Decorated Delight', 'Decorated Giant', 'George Barr', 'Here I Am', 'Leichtlini', 'Merlin's Magic', 'Network', 'Real Harmony', 'Red, White, And Blue', 'Conical', 'Turkish Dancer', 'Turkish Delight', 'Vaga', and 'Zwanenburg Beauty'.

'Zwanenburg Beauty' has blue (or blue white) flowers that are edged in bronze and have bronze veins. It grows to a height of between 30 and 40 cm (12 and 16 in) tall. It has lilac shading on the falls. The beard is bronze-red or cream-white.

== Sources ==
- Aldén, B., S. Ryman & M. Hjertson. 2009. Våra kulturväxters namn – ursprung och användning. Formas, Stockholm (Handbook on Swedish cultivated and utility plants, their names and origin).
- Czerepanov, S. K. 1995. Vascular plants of Russia and adjacent states (the former USSR).
- Dykes, The Genus Iris, page 126, 1913
- Khassanov, F. O. & N. Rakhimova. 2012. Taxonomic revision of the genus Iris L. (Iridaceae Juss.) for the flora of Central Asia. Stapfia 97:177.
- Komarov, V. L. et al., eds. 1934–1964. Flora SSSR.
- Mathew, B. 1981. The Iris. 64.
