= Iris curvifolia =

Scientific classification
- Kingdom: Plantae
- Clade: Tracheophytes
- Clade: Angiosperms
- Clade: Monocots
- Order: Asparagales
- Family: Iridaceae
- Genus: Iris
- Subgenus: Iris subg. Iris
- Section: Iris sect. Psammiris
- Species: I. curvifolia

Binomial name
- Iris curvifolia Y.T.Zhao

Synonyms
- None known

Species of flowering plant

Iris curvifolia is a plant species in the genus Iris, it is also in the subgenus of Iris, and in the Psammiris section. It is a rhizomatous perennial, from China. It has sickle-shaped long leaves, short stem and yellow or bright yellow flowers. It is cultivated as an ornamental plant in temperate regions.

== Description ==
It is similar in form to Iris bloudowii, but smaller, although it has slightly inflated bracts.

It has short, thick yellow-brown rhizomes, that are about 2 cm (1 in) in diameter. Underneath, are thick fibrous secondary roots. On top of the rhizome, are the bases of last seasons leaves.

It has glaucous green leaves, that are falcate (or sickle-shaped) or bent slightly above middle of the leaf. They can grow up to between 10–20 cm (4–8 in) long and 1–1.5 cm wide. They have an acuminate (or pointed) end.

It has leafless, stems that can reach up to between 8–15 cm (3–6 in) long.

The stem has 3, lanceolate, spathes or bracts (leaves of the flower bud), which are 5–6 cm (2–2 in) long and 13–1.8 cm (5–1 in) wide. They have membranous edges and acuminate ends.

The stems hold 2 terminal (top of stem) flowers, between May and June. They are held on very short pedicels.

The flowers are 4.5–6 cm (2–2 in) in diameter, come in yellow, or bright yellow.

It has 2 pairs of petals, 3 large sepals (outer petals), known as the 'falls' and 3 inner, smaller petals (or tepals), known as the 'standards'. The falls are obovate, with brown veins, lines or stripes, and a central yellow, or pale yellow beard. They are 4.5 cm (2 in) long and 1.5 cm wide. The standards are oblanceolate and 4 cm (2 in) long and 1.3 cm wide.

It has 2–3 cm (1–1 in) long and funnel shaped, perianth tube, a cylindrical, 1.8–2.2 cm (1–1 in) long ovary. It also has 2.2 cm long stamens, golden yellow or yellow anthers. It has 3 cm long and 4 mm wide style branches, which has lobes that are obliquely lanceolate.

After the iris has flowered, between July and September. it produces a yellow green, ellipsoid, or obovate seed capsule, which is 4 cm long and 2 cm wide, with a short beak, and yellow green with 6 ribs. Inside the capsules, are reddish brown, pyriform (pear-shaped) seeds, which are about 7 mm long.

== Taxonomy ==
It is written as 弯叶鸢尾 in Chinese script, and known as wān yè yuān wěi in Pinyin in China.

It is commonly known as the 'curved leaf iris'.

The Latin specific epithet curvifolia refers to having curved leaves.

It was first published and described by Yu Tang Zhao in 'Acta Phytotaxonomica Sinica' (Acta Phytotax. Sin.) Vol.20 Issue1 on page 99 in 1982.

The type specimen (for the description) was collected from Bole, Xinjiang.

It was verified by United States Department of Agriculture and the Agricultural Research Service on 4 April 2003, it was then updated on 29 September 2008.

== Distribution and habitat ==
It is native to temperate regions of Asia.

=== Range ===
It is found in China, within the Chinese province, of Xinjiang.

In 2011, a study was carried out on the vegetation of Karlik Mountain, within the Tian Shan Mountains. Iris curvifolia was 1 of the 14 endemic species of Xinjiang region.

=== Habitat ===
It grows in the meadows and grasslands on hillsides.

== Cultivation ==
It is rare and not in general cultivation in the UK.

== Sources ==
- Mathew, B. 1981. The Iris. 194.
- Waddick, J. W. & Zhao Yu-tang. 1992. Iris of China.
- Wu Zheng-yi & P. H. Raven et al., eds. 1994–. Flora of China
