= Iris griffithii =

Scientific classification
- Kingdom: Plantae
- Clade: Tracheophytes
- Clade: Angiosperms
- Clade: Monocots
- Order: Asparagales
- Family: Iridaceae
- Genus: Iris
- Subgenus: Iris subg. Iris
- Section: Iris sect. Pogon
- Species: I. griffithii

Binomial name
- Iris griffithii Baker

Synonyms
- None known

Species of plant

Iris griffithii is a plant species in the genus Iris, it is also in the subgenus Iris. It is a rhizomatous perennial, from Afghanistan. It has short, sickle-shaped leaves, short green stem and purple flowers with white beards. Several specimens exist within herbaria around Europe, but it is rarely cultivated.

== Description ==
It is similar in form to Iris chamaeiris. Which is now a synonym of Iris lutescens. Although has various differences from it, to separate the two species.

It has a stout rhizome.

It has erect, falcate (sickle shaped) leaves that can grow up to between 15–30 cm (6–12 in) long and between 2.7 cm wide.

It has a slender green stem or peduncle, that can grow up to between 12–40 cm (5–16 in) tall. It is classed as a dwarf species. It is similar in size to Iris kashmiriana, but the rest of form is very different.

The stem has 2 stem leaves, from the midpoint, upwards, and a long green, spathes (leaves of the flower bud). The spathes are different to Iris pseudopumila, which has membranous and curled spathes.

The stem holds 2 terminal (top of stem) flowers, blooming early summer, between May or August.

The flowers come in shades of purple. Like other irises, it has 2 pairs of petals, 3 large sepals (outer petals), known as the 'falls' and 3 inner, smaller petals (or tepals), known as the 'standards'. The falls are about 5 cm long, in the centre of each petal, they have a dense white beard. The standards are about 4 cm long.

The perianth tube is 2–5 cm (1–2 in) long, which is also different to Iris pseudopumila.

It has 3 cm long styles arms, and a 0.8 cm long anther.

After the iris has flowered, it produces a seed capsule, which has not yet been described.

=== Biochemistry ===
As most irises are diploid, having two sets of chromosomes, this can be used to identify hybrids and classification of groupings. It has not been counted.

== Taxonomy ==
The Latin specific epithet griffithii refers to William Griffith (1810–45), English botanist and Superintendent of Calcutta Botanic Garden. Who collected the iris in Afghanistan.

It was first published and described by Baker in 'Handbook of the Iridaceae' (Handb. Irid.) Vol.32. in 1892.

It was thought that no plants had been found in the wild, since William Rickatson Dykes had described the iris in 18, but several specimens are stored within herbaria. Although, in 2012, it was listed on a checklist of the flowering plants of Afghanistan. The herbarium specimens, have only one sterile leaf, and the colour has faded from the flowers.

It was verified by United States Department of Agriculture and the Agricultural Research Service on 4 April 2003, then updated on 2 December 2004.

It is not listed in the Encyclopedia of Life, as of 14 October 2015.

Iris griffithii is not an accepted name by the RHS, as of 14 October 2015.

== Distribution and habitat ==
It is native to temperate central Asia.

=== Range ===
It is found in Afghanistan, (within the province of Kunar Province, and Nuristan Province,). Including on the border between north India and Afghanistan.

== Cultivation ==
It is very difficult to find for sale or in cultivation.

It is thought best (by Dykes) to plant between May and August, after the flowers have faded.

=== Propagation ===
Irises can generally be propagated by division, or by seed growing.

== Toxicity ==
Like many other irises, most parts of the plant are poisonous (rhizome and leaves), and if mistakenly ingested can cause stomach pains and vomiting. Handling the plant may cause skin irritation or an allergic reaction.

== Sources ==
- Mathew, B. 1981. The Iris. 28.
- Rechinger, K. H., ed. 1963–. Flora iranica.
