= Iris lineata =

Scientific classification
- Kingdom: Plantae
- Clade: Tracheophytes
- Clade: Angiosperms
- Clade: Monocots
- Order: Asparagales
- Family: Iridaceae
- Genus: Iris
- Subgenus: Iris subg. Iris
- Section: Iris sect. Regelia
- Species: I. lineata

Binomial name
- Iris lineata Foster ex Regel

Synonyms
- Iris karategina B.Fedtsch.

Species of plant

Iris lineata is a plant species in the genus Iris, it is also in the subgenus Iris, and in the section Regelia. It is a rhizomatous perennial, from the mountains of Turkestan, between Tajikistan and Afghanistan. It has tall slender stems, long leaves and greenish yellow flowers covered, with brown violet, or brown purple veining over the top. It is cultivated as an ornamental plant in temperate regions.

== Description ==
It is very similar in form toIris darwasica.

It has a small, short rhizome, which is less than 2 cm long. It is covered (on the top) with the fibrous remains of last seasons leaves. It has secondary roots, short stolons.

It has erect, linear, leaves that are 6–40 cm (2–16 in) long and 0.3–0.6 cm wide. They disappear after the blooming period, and begin to re-grow the next season in January.

It has an erect stem, that can grow up to between 15–35 cm (6–14 in) tall.

The stem has acuminate (pointed), membranous, spathes or bracts, (leaves of the flower bud), which are 5.5 cm (2 in) long, with pale margins. The upper third of the spathe is flushed purple.

The stems hold between 2 and 3 terminal (top of stem) flowers, blooming in spring, between April and May.

The long and thin, flowers are 5–6 cm (2–2 in) in diameter. They are greenish yellow, with brown violet, or brown purple veining over the top.

It has 2 pairs of petals, 3 large sepals (outer petals), known as the 'falls' and 3 inner, smaller petals (or tepals), known as the 'standards'. The elliptic to oblanceolate falls are 4.5 cm (2 in) long, and 1.3 cm wide, with a long blue beard, in the centre of the fall. The elliptic to oblanceolate standards are 4.5 cm (2 in) long, they also have a thin beard.

It has short pedicels and a 2.5–4 cm (1–2 in) long perianth tube. It has pale blue style branches, that are 2.5–3 cm (1–1 in) long, purple brown lobes, anthers that are 1.4–1.7 cm long, filaments that are 1–1.2 cm long and yellow pollen.

After the iris has flowered, it produces a seed capsule and seed, which have not been described.

=== Biochemistry ===
As most irises are diploid, having two sets of chromosomes, this can be used to identify hybrids and classification of groupings. It has a chromosome count: 2n=22.

== Taxonomy ==
It is pronounced as (Iris) EYE-ris (lineata) lin-ee-AY-tuh.

It is commonly known as 'Lined Iris' (in Russia).

The Latin specific epithet lineata means with lines (or stripes). It refers to the veins on the narrow standards and falls.

It was first published and described by Regel in 'Gartenflora' Vol.36 Issue 201, table 1244 in 1887. Then by Foster in Curtis's Botanical Magazine Vol.114 in 1888. It was also published (by Foster) in The Gardeners' Chronicle Series 3 Vol.4 page 36 in 1888.

Was once thought a synonym of Iris darwasica,

In 1935, Iris karategina was published and described by B.Fedtsch., in 'Flora URSS' (Flora Unionis Rerumpublicarum Sovieticarum Socialisticarum) Vol 4 page542. It was later classified as a synonym of Iris lineata.

In 1968, it was published in 'Yearbook of the British Iris Society' with a colour illustration.

It was verified by United States Department of Agriculture and the Agricultural Research Service on 2 October 2014.

Iris lineata is an accepted name by the RHS.

== Distribution and habitat ==
Iris lineata is native to temperate areas of central Asia.

a native to Central Asia (north of Afghanistan). Central Asia, north-eastern Afghanistan

=== Range ===
It was found in the former country of Turkestan. The current range is between Tajikistan, (including the Karateginskii Range, within the Gissar Mountain Range), and in Afghanistan, within the upper Farkhar Valley of Farkhar District, in the Takhar Province.

=== Habitat ===
It grows on the dry, rocky open slopes of granite mountains.

They can be found at an altitude of 1,600–2,500 m (5,200–8,200 ft) above sea level.

== Conservation ==
This is a protected iris, listed on the Red Data Book of Tajikistan.

== Cultivation ==
It prefers to grow in well-drained soils in full sun.

It can be grown in alpine houses.

It was last introduced into cultivation in the UK by Paul Furse in 1967.

== Sources ==
- Czerepanov, S. K. 1995. Vascular plants of Russia and adjacent states (the former USSR).
- Khassanov, F. O. & N. Rakhimova. 2012. Taxonomic revision of the genus Iris L. (Iridaceae Juss.) for the flora of Central Asia. Stapfia 97:175.
- Mathew, B. 1981. The Iris. 64.
- Rechinger, K. H., ed. 1963–. Flora iranica.
