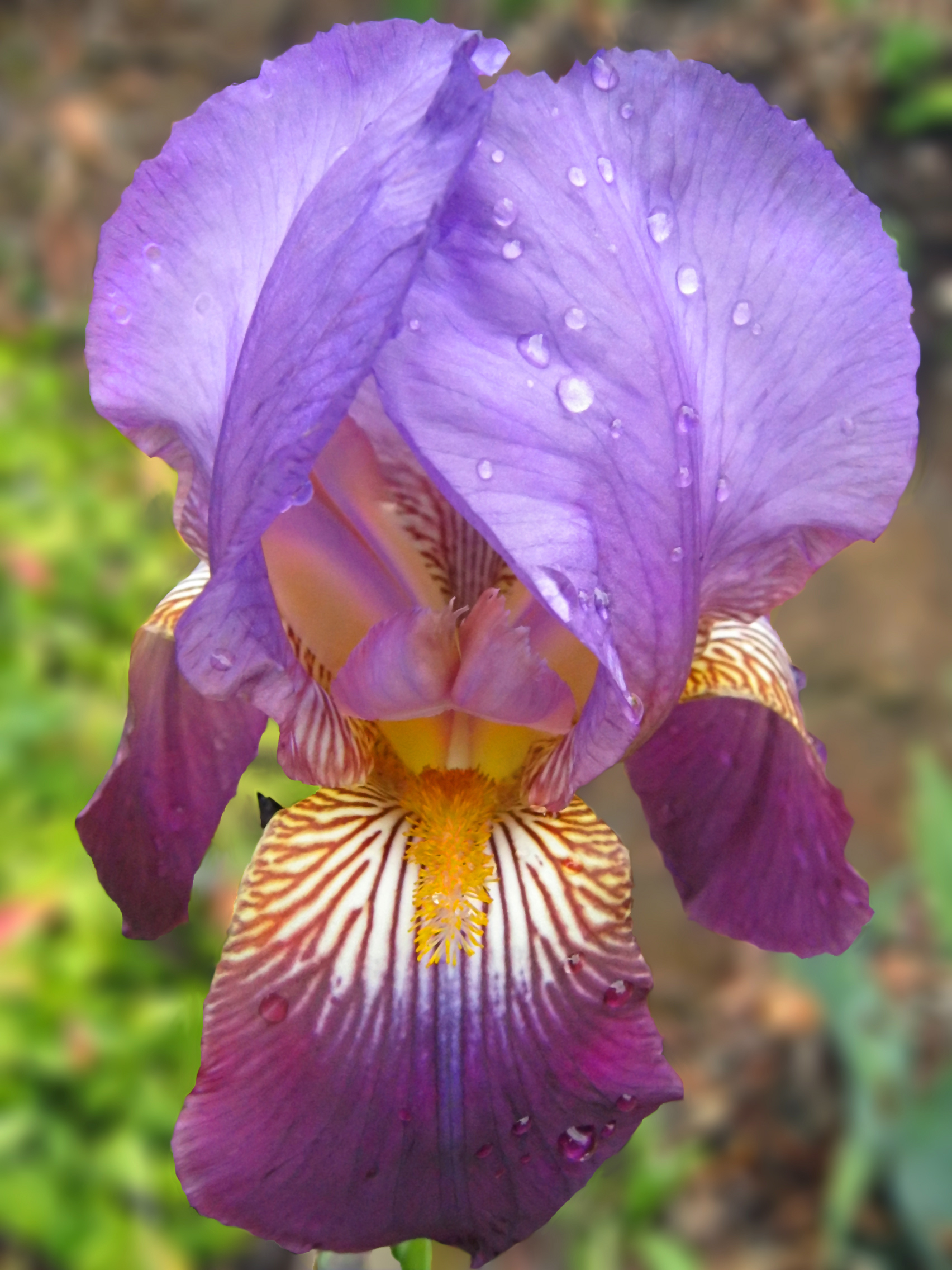
- Purple bearded iris

Scientific classification
- Kingdom: Plantae
- Clade: Embryophytes
- Clade: Tracheophytes
- Clade: Spermatophytes
- Clade: Angiosperms
- Clade: Monocots
- Order: Asparagales
- Family: Iridaceae
- Subfamily: Iridoideae
- Tribe: Irideae
- Genus: Iris
- Subgenus: Iris subg. Iris

Type species
- Iris germanica

= Iris subg. Iris =

Subgenus of flowering plants

Subgenus Iris is one subgenus of Iris.

Iris as a plant was originally named by Carl Linnaeus in his book Systema Naturae (in 1735), with a great number of species being added into the genus. Including new ones that were found after the book's publication. The division of irises into various subgroups, has taken various forms over the years. By the 19th century botanists had created new genera such as Evansia, Hermodactylus, Moraea, Oncocyclus, and Xiphion. Opinion was often divided whether to split the genus into several parts or lump them back into Iris. From J. G. Baker, who separated some such as Moraea and Xiphion from Iris in his book 'Handbook of the Irideae' (published in London) in 1892. Then William R. Dykes, who clarified the situation by a compromise in his monograph The Genus Iris (by Cambridge University Press, 1913; later reprinted in 1974 by Dover). He was the first to term the subgroup as Iris sect. Iris. G. Rodionenko's 1961 reclassification in The Genus Iris (written in Russian, Moscow, 1961) was more comprehensive in that he split the genus into five genera: Iris (which included all rhizomatous irises). A taxonomic revision by Brian Mathew in 1981 (The iris, New York: Universe Books), recognized six subgenera: Nepalensis Dykes, Xiphium (Miller) Spach, Scorpiris Spach, Hermodactyloides Spach, Iris L. and Limniris Tausch. Recently, DNA analysis has been used to determine groupings.

== Taxonomy ==
The subgenus Iris subg. Iris is an autonym. It has been divided into six sections:

- Iris sect. Hexapogon
- Iris sect. Iris
- Iris sect. Oncocyclus
- Iris sect. Psammiris
- Iris sect. Pseudoregelia
- Iris sect. Regelia

Sections Oncocyclus and Regelia are also called aril irises.

== Section bearded irises (or pogon irises) ==
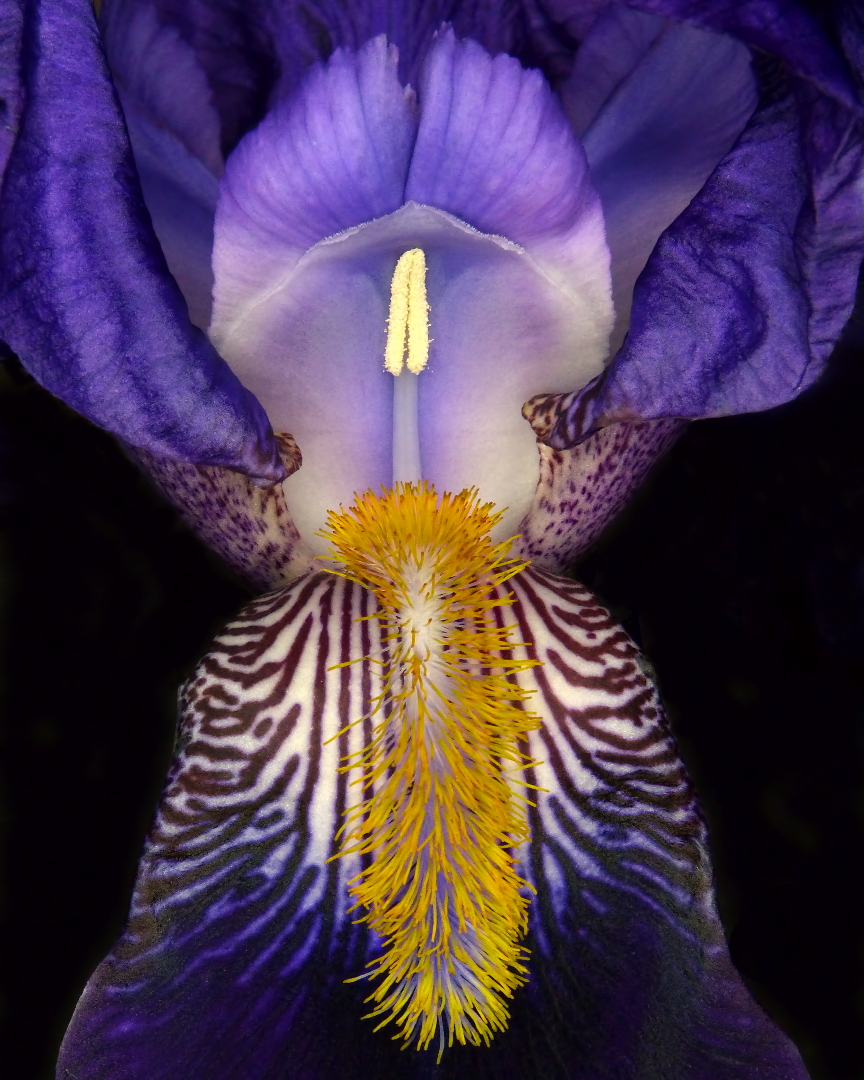
Close-up of the flower, showing the yellow hairs of the 'beard'

This is the largest section of the subgenus, the true bearded irises. Most irises come from Southern or eastern Europe. 'Pogon' refers to the Greek word for beard. It has several species of iris including;

Image	Scientific name	Distribution
	Iris adriatica Trinajstic ex Mitic 2002	Croatia
	Iris albertii Regel 1877	Kazakhstan
	Iris alexeenkoi Grossh. 1950	Azerbaijan
	Iris aphylla L. 1753—stool iris, table iris, leafless iris.	Azerbaijan, Russian Federation, Czech Republic, Germany, Hungary, Poland, Belarus, Ukraine, Bulgaria, Albania, Former Yugoslavia, Italy, Romania and France.
	Iris attica (Boiss. & Heldr.) Hayek 1859	North Macedonia, Turkey, Greece
	Iris benacensis A.Kern. ex Stapf 1887	Italy
	Iris bicapitata Colas. 1996	Italy
	Iris calabra (N.Terracc.) Peruzzi 2009	Italy
	Iris florentina L. 1759 — white flag Iris, white cemetery iris.	Saudi Arabia, Yemen
	Iris furcata Bieb. 1832—forked iris.	Turkey, Ukraine
	Iris × germanica L. 1753—German iris (I. pallida × I. variegata).	Balkan Peninsula
	Iris glaucescens Bunge 1829	Russia, Kazakhstan, Mongolia and China
	Iris griffithii Baker 1892	Afghanistan
	Iris hellenica Mermygkas 2010	Greece
	Iris imbricata Lindl. 1845	Iran, Armenia, Azerbaijan and Georgia
	Iris junonia Schott ex Kotschy 1854	Turkey
	Iris kashmiriana Baker 1877	India
	Iris lutescens Lam. 1789 (including I. italica)	Spain, Southern France and Italy
	Iris marsica I.Ricci & Colas. 1973 publ. 1974	Italy
	Iris orjeniiBräuchler & Cikovac 2007 —Orjen iris	Montenegro and Bosnia and Herzegovina
	Iris pallidaLam. 1789 —sweet iris, Dalmatian iris	Croatia
	Iris pallida subsp. illyrica (Tomm. ex Vis.) K.Richt. 1890	endemic to Balkan Peninsula.
	Iris pallida subsp. cengialti (Ambrosi ex A.Kern.) Foster 1886 Iris cengialti	Italy
	Iris perrieri Simonet ex P.Fourn. 2003	France, Italy
	Iris pseudopumila Tineo 1827	Italy, Sicily, Malta
	Iris pumila L. 1753	Albania, Austria, Bulgaria, Central European Russia, Czechoslovakia, East European Russia, Hungary, Kazakhstan, Krym, North Caucasus, Romania, South European Russia, Transcaucasus, Ukraine
	Iris relicta Colas. 1996	Italy
	Iris reichenbachii Heuff. 1858—Reichenbach's iris	Bulgaria, Montenegro, Serbia, North Macedonia, and Greece
	Iris revoluta Colas. 1978	Italy
	Iris scariosa Willd. ex Link 1820	Russia, Kazakhstan, Mongolia and China
	Iris schachtii Markgr. 1957	Turkey
	Iris sicula Tod. 1858 —Mesopotamian iris	Iraq, Turkey, Syria and Israel
	Iris suaveolens Boiss. & Reut. 1854 (including I. iliensis)	Bulgaria, Romania, Albania, Macedonia, Turkey, and Greece.
	Iris taochia Woronow ex Grossh. 1928	Turkey
	Iris timofejewii Woronow 1924	Russia (Dagestan)
	Iris variegata L. 1753—Hungarian iris	Austria, Bulgaria, Czechoslovakia, Germany, Greece, Hungary, Romania, Ukraine, Yugoslavia

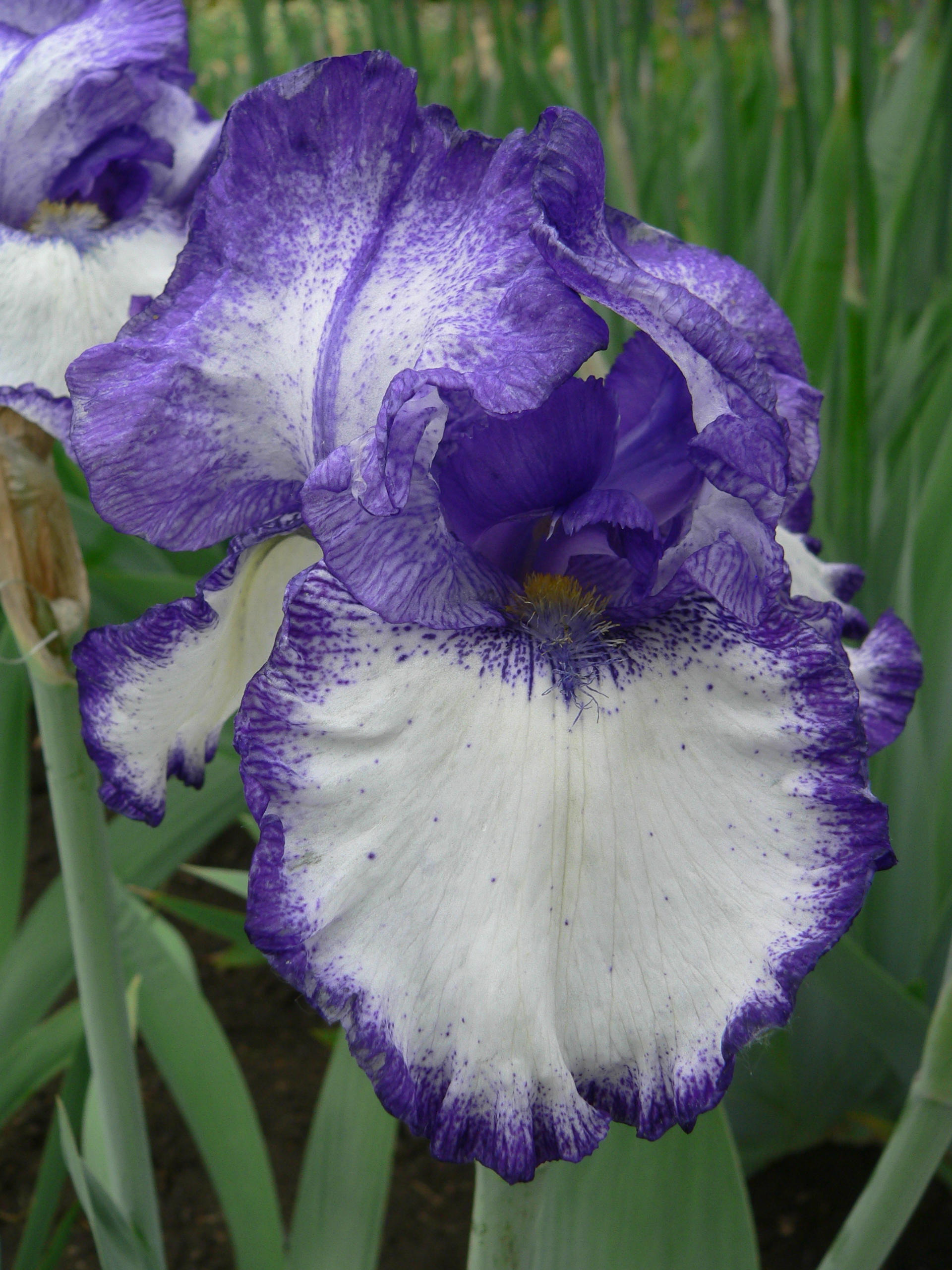
Bearded iris cultivar 'Stepping Out'

It also includes thousands of ornamental plant cultivars, which have been divided into various height categories.

- MDB – Miniature dwarf bearded
- SDB – Standard dwarf bearded
- IB – Intermediate bearded
- BB – Border bearded
- MTB – Miniature tall bearded
- TB – Tall bearded

== Psammiris ==
This section of irises was first described by Spach. Most of the Irises come from Russia and Northwest China. Mostly rhizomatous, and flowering in late spring. 'Psammiris' is derived from the Greek word psammos for sand. The type species for this section is Iris arenaria

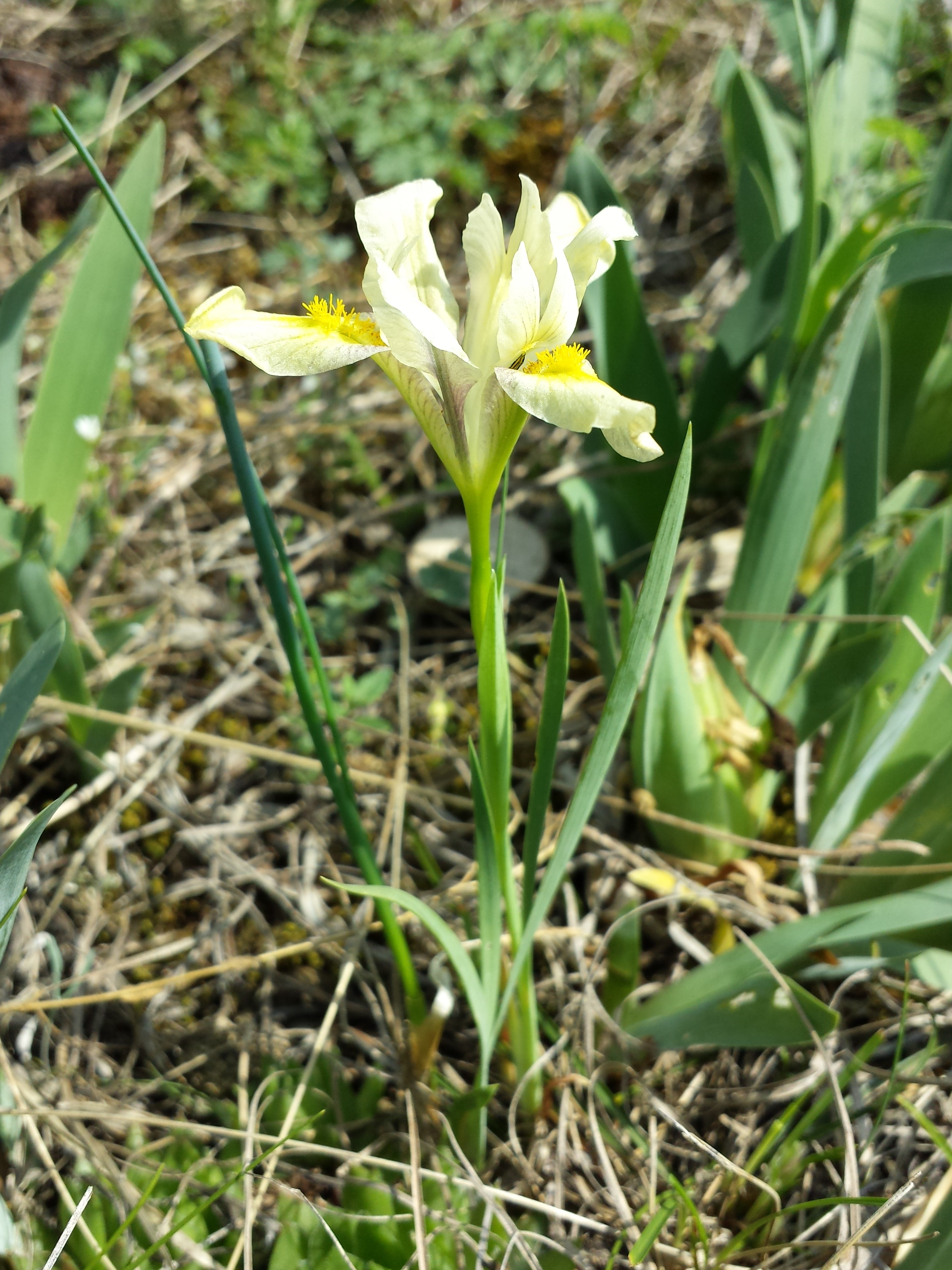
Iris humilis subsp. arenaria

It includes;

Image	Scientific name	Distribution
	Iris arenaria Waldst. 1801 and Kit.	Hungary, Austria, Romania, Czech Republic and Ukraine.
	Iris bloudowii Bunge. 1830	Russia (Siberia), Kazakhstan, Mongolia, China (Xinjiang)
	Iris curvifolia Zhao	China (Xinjiang)
	Iris humilis Georgi 1775	China ( Heilongjiang, Jilin, Nei Monggol, Ningxia and Xinjiang), Russia (Buryatia, Chita, Irkutsk, Magadan, Primorye and Tuva.), Mongolia, Japan, Austria, Czechoslovakia, Hungary, Kazakhstan, and Romania
	Iris kamelinii Alexeeva 2006	Mongolia
	Iris mandshurica Maxim. 1880	China (Heilongjiang, Jilin, Liaoning), Korea, Russia
	Iris potaninii Maxim. 1880	Russia (Siberia), Mongolia and China (Gansu, Qinghai, Sichuan, Xizang )
	Iris vorobievii N.S.Pavlova 1987	Russia (Primorye, Primorsky Krai)

== Oncocyclus ==
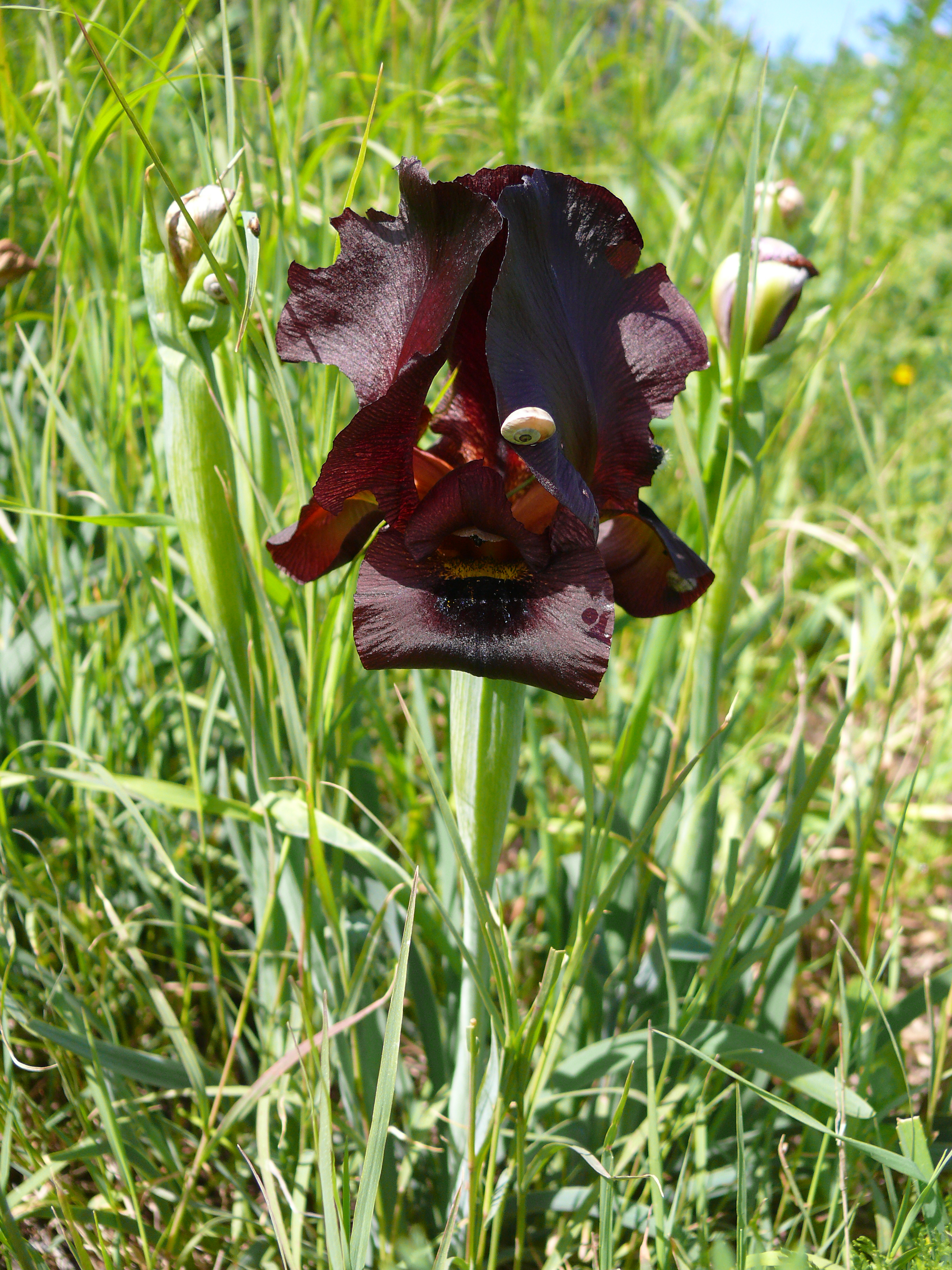
Iris atropurpurea from Israel

Oncocyclus irises are rhizomatous perennials. They also generally need rich soils that drain easy and are in full sun. Most also prefer a dry period after flowering. The Oncocyclus irises are mostly from Turkey, Caucasus and Iran. The plants usually have only one flower, which is veined or spotted. Some of these species have been bred with bearded irises to create unique colours and markings. Oncocyclus is a Greek word, with onco meaning mass, or bulk, and cyclus meaning circle. In 1846, the term 'Oncocyclus' was first used by C.H. Siemssen as the Genus Oncocyclus in 1846 in Botanische Zeitung. Baker then re-classified it to a subgenus in 1877, than Dykes lowered it to a section in 1914, where it currently remains.

Image	Scientific name	Distribution
	Iris acutiloba C.A.Mey. 1831 (including I. ewbankiana )	Turkey, Armenia, Azerbaijan, Turkmenistan, Dagestan, Iran
	Iris antilibanotica Dinsmore 1933 publ. 1934	Syria
	Iris assadiana Chaudhary, Kirkw. & C.Weymolauth 1975 publ. 1976	Syria
	Iris auranitica Dinsmore 1933 publ. 1934	Syria
	Iris atrofusca Bak. 1889	Israel, Palestine, and Jordan.
	Iris atropurpurea Bak. 1889	Israel
	Iris barnumiae Bak. & Fost.	Armenia, Azerbaijan, Iran, Iraq, and Turkey.
	Iris basaltica Dinsmore 1933 publ. 1934	Iran, Iraq, Lebanon-Syria, Turkey
	Iris bismarckiana Reg. 1890 – Nazareth iris	Israel, Lebanon, Jordan and Syria
	Iris bostrensis Mouterde 1955	Syria and Jordan
	Iris camillae Grossh. 1928	Azerbaijan
	Iris cedreti Dinsm. ex Chaudhary 1972	Lebanon
	Iris damascena Mouterde 1966	Syria (Jabl Qasyoun)
	Iris gatesii Foster 1890	Turkey and Iraq
	Iris grossheimii Woronow ex Grossh. 1928	Georgia, Armenia and Azerbaijan.
]	Iris haynei Baker 1876 – Gilboa iris	Israel and Palestine
	Iris heylandiana Boiss. & Reut. 1882	Iraq
	Iris hermona Dinsmore 1933 publ. 1934 – Hermon iris	Israel and Syria.
	Iris iberica Hoffm. 1808	Armenia, eastern Georgia, and western Azerbaijan.
	Iris kirkwoodi Chaudhary 1972 (including I. calcarea)	Syria and Turkey
	Iris lortetii Barbey ex Boiss. 1882	Israel, Palestine, Lebanon, and Syria
	Iris mariae Barbey. 1891	Israel, Egypt and Palestine
	Iris meda Stapf 1885	Iran and Azerbaijan.
	Iris nigricans Dinsm. 1933 publ. 1934	Jordan
	Iris paradoxa Steven 1817	Iran, Turkey, Armenia and in Azerbaijan.
	Iris petrana Dinsm. 1933 publ. 1934	Jordan and Israel.
	Iris sari Schott ex Bak. 1876	Turkey
	Iris susiana L. 1753 – mourning iris	Lebanon, Syria and Turkey
	Iris westii Dinsm. 1933 publ. 1934	Lebanon
	Iris yebrudii Dinsm. ex Chaud. 1972	Syria

== Regelia ==
Mostly from the mountainous regions of Iran, Afghanistan and the Altai Mountains. Most irises have a stem that has 2 flowers. It was named in 1904 by Robert Lynch in his book The Book of The Iris after Dr Regel. The type species for this section is Iris korolkowii

Image	Scientific name	Distribution
	Iris afghanica Wend 1972	Afghanistan
	Iris darwasica Regel 1884	Tajikistan and northern Afghanistan
	Iris heweri Grey-Wilson & B. Mathew 1974	Afghanistan.
	Iris hoogiana Dykes 1916	Turkestan, Tajikistan, and Uzbekistan
	Iris korolkowii Regel	Afghanistan and Uzbekistan
	Iris kuschkensis Grey-Wilson & B. Mathew 1974	Afghanistan.
	Iris lineata Foster ex Regel 1887	Tajikistan and Afghanistan
	Iris stolonifera Maxim. 1880	Tajikistan, Uzbekistan and Afghanistan

Hybrids of Regelia irises and Oncocyclus irises are known as Regelicyclous.

== Hexapogon ==
Mostly from the desert area of Central Asia, Iran and Afghanistan. The type species for this section is Iris falcifolia Most irises have beards on the falls and standards. Etymologically, hexa refers to the number 6 and pogon refers to the Greek word for beard.

Image	Scientific name	Distribution
	Iris falcifolia Bunge 1852	Uzbekistan, Kazakhstan, Afghanistan, Iran and Pakistan.
	Iris longiscapa Ledeb. 1852	Kazakhstan, Tajikistan, Turkmenistan and Uzbekistan

== Pseudoregelia ==
Mostly from the mountainous regions of Eastern Asia. Most irises have flowers that have blotches or colour spots on. The type species for this section is Iris tigridia

Image	Scientific name	Distribution
	Iris cuniculiformis Noltie & K.Y.Guan 1995	China (Sichuan, Yunnan)
	Iris dolichosiphon Noltie 1990	China (Sichuan, Xizang, Yunnan), Bhutan, India and Myanmar
	Iris goniocarpa Bak. 1876	China (Gansu, Hubei, Qinghai, Shaanxi, Sichuan, Yunnan, Xizang), Bhutan, Myanmar, Nepal, India (Sikkim)
	Iris hookeriana Fost. 1887	Pakistan (Chitral, Swat, Gilgit, Hazara), India (Himachal Pradesh, Kashmir).
	Iris ivanovae Doronkin 1987	Russia, China, and Mongolia
	Iris kemaonensis Wall. 1839	China (Xizang), Bhutan, India (Kashmir) and Nepal
	Iris leptophylla Lingelsheim 1922	China (Gansu, Sichuan)
	Iris narcissiflora Diels. 1924	China (Sichuan)
	Iris psammocola Y.T.Zhao 1992	China (Ningxia)
	Iris sikkimensis Dykes 1913 (Iris hookeriana x Iris kumaonensis.)	India (Sikkim)
	Iris tigridia Bunge ex Ledeb. 1829	China(Gansu, Heilongjiang, Jilin, Liaoning, Nei Mongol, Qinghai, Shanxi, Sichuan), Kazakhstan, Mongolia, Russia
