= Paul Mouterde =

French naturalist

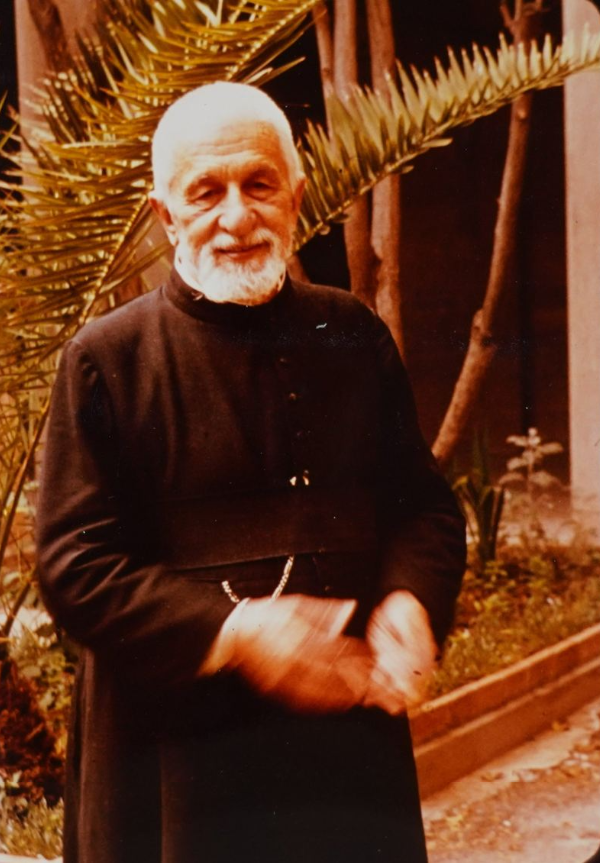
- Picture of Paul Mouterde, taken on 6 May 1967 in Beirut.
- Born: Bruyères
- Died: Bruyères
- Scientific career
- Fields: Botany, Zoology, Ethnology
- Author abbrev. (botany): Mouterde

Paul Mouterde (1892– 14 January 1972) was a French Jesuit missionary and naturalist, and the director of the Oriental Library at the Saint Joseph University of Beirut.

He published two previously unknown homilies of fifth-century Syriac poet-theologian Jacob of Serugh, and multiple works on Levantine flora, including a three-volume work on the flora of Lebanon and Syria.

== Early life ==
Paul Mouterde was born in 1862 in Bruyères, in the French Department of Vosges. His father was Professor of Law at the Catholic University of Lyon.

== Selected works ==
- Petite flore des environs de Beyrouth (1935)
- La Flore du Djebel Druze (1953)
- Deux homélies inédites de Jacques de Saroug (1944)
- Nouvelle flore du Liban et de la Syrie (1966–1978)
