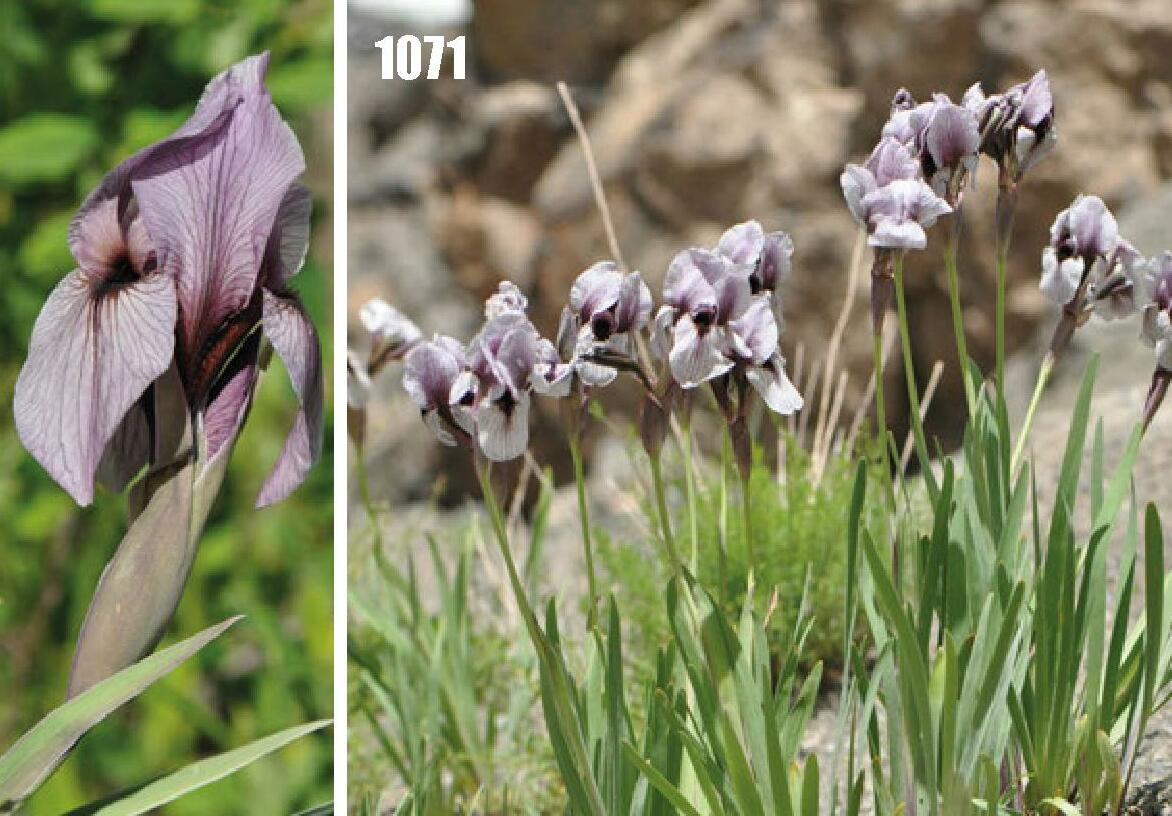

Scientific classification
- Kingdom: Plantae
- Clade: Tracheophytes
- Clade: Angiosperms
- Clade: Monocots
- Order: Asparagales
- Family: Iridaceae
- Genus: Iris
- Subgenus: Iris subg. Iris
- Section: Iris sect. Regelia
- Species: I. darwasica

Binomial name
- Iris darwasica Regel

Synonyms
- Iris suworowii Regel

= Iris darwasica =

Species of plant

Iris darwasica is a plant species from Tajikistan and northern Afghanistan in the genus Iris. It is also in the subgenus Iris, and in the section Regelia. It is a rhizomatous perennial. It has long and thin glaucous to grey-green leaves, slender stem and greenish cream or greenish yellow, to dark purple or lilac flowers.

== Description ==
It can be separated in form from Iris korolkowii (another Regelia iris) by the flowers having rounded ends to the longer falls and standards and it also has wider leaves.

It has a short and slender rhizome. The top of the rhizome has the fibrous remains of last seasons leaves. It has a creeping habit, which can form large clumps of plants.

It has glaucous, or bluish green, or grey-green leaves, that are generally linear or ensiform (sword shaped). Although the outer leaves can be falcate (sickle-shaped). They can grow up to between 15 and 40 cm (6 and 16 in) long, and between 0.4 and 1 cm wide. The foliage dies back after flowering and becomes dormant during the summer.

It has a slender stem, that can grow up to between 15 and 40 cm (6 and 16 in) tall.

The stems hold 2 to 3 terminal (top of stem) flowers.

The stems also have 2 or 3 spathes (leaves of the flower bud), which are keeled, green, oblong or lanceolate (shaped) and 6.3 cm (2 in) long.

The fragrant, flowers bloom in spring, between April and May (in Europe and the UK), but in June (in Russia). and are 5–6 cm (2–2 in) in diameter, they come in shades of greenish cream, or greenish yellow, to dark purple, or lilac.

Iris darwasica is the first of the Regelia section irises to flower.

It has 2 pairs of petals, 3 large sepals (outer petals), known as the 'falls' and 3 inner, smaller petals (or tepals), known as the 'standards'. The obovate or linear, falls are 7 cm (3 in) long and 2.7 cm wide, they are veined with purple, or raspberry red, or brown-red. In the centre, it has a purple, or bluish beard. The standards are similar in size and shape to the falls. they also have a dark beards.

It has a green, cylindrical perianth tube, which is as long as the ovary.

It also has a yellowish green style, which has small narrow, crests and is 2.3 cm long.

It has linear anthers which are 1.27 cm (half an inch) long.

After the iris has flowered, it produces a seed capsule and seeds which have not yet been described.

=== Biochemistry ===
As most irises are diploid, having two sets of chromosomes, this can be used to identify hybrids and classification of groupings. It has a chromosome count: 2n=22.

== Taxonomy ==
It is sometimes known as the Darwas Iris, or Davraz Iris, or 'Darvas Iris', It is known as 'Iris Darvasky' in Russia.

The Latin specific epithet darwasica refers to Darvaz mountains (between Tajikistan and Afghanistan), where the iris is found.

It was first published and described by Eduard August von Regel in 'Trudy Imp. S.-Peterburgsk. Bot. Sada' Vol.8 Issue 679 in 1884.

It was described from specimens found in Turkestan, on 'Mount Ala-kisryak', east of the Lulyab mountains.

Iris Suworowi was also published and described by Regel in ' Trudy Imp. S.-Peterburgsk. Bot. Sada Vol.9 page619 in 1886. This was later re-classified as a synonym of Iris darwasica.

It was once thought that Iris lineata, was a form of Iris darwasica.

It was verified by United States Department of Agriculture and the Agricultural Research Service on 2 October 2014.

Iris darwasica is an accepted name by the RHS.

== Distribution and habitat ==
It is native to temperate central Asia.

=== Range ===
It is found in the former region of USSR, (of Turkestan), now known as Tajikistan, and also in northern Afghanistan.

=== Habitat ===
It grows on the sunny, rocky, open mountain slopes.

They can be found at altitudes of between 700 to 1,200 m (2,300 to 3,900 ft) and 2,000 to 2,600 m (6,600 to 8,500 ft) above sea level.

== Conservation ==
It is listed as 'endangered', in the 1997 IUCN Red List of Threatened Plants. It is still listed on the current Red List.

In 2012, it was listed as 'Davraz iris' in the Red Data book of Tajikistan, as a 'declining' species.

It is endangered due to the effects of collecting flowers and economic activity in Tajikistan.

It has been found within the 'Childukhtaron Nature Reserve' in the Darvaz Mountains, the reserve is 270 km south east of Dushanbe,(the capital city of Tajikistan).

== Cultivation ==
It is hardy to European Zone H3, between USDA Zone 5 and Zone 6. Within the UK, it may be possible to grow the iris within a plant frame.

It prefers to grow in well drained, sunny situations.

It is best planted in October.

It is rare and been in cultivation.

A specimen was tested for hardiness at Leningrad Botanical Garden in Russia.

== Culture ==
On 3 April 1998, a postage stamp of Tajikistan was issued with an illustration of the iris. It was part of a series of 4 plant illustrations.

== Sources ==
- Czerepanov, S. K. 1995. Vascular plants of Russia and adjacent states (the former USSR).
- Khassanov, F. O. & N. Rakhimova. 2012. Taxonomic revision of the genus Iris L. (Iridaceae Juss.) for the flora of Central Asia. Stapfia 97:175.
- Komarov, V. L. et al., eds. 1934–1964. Flora SSSR. [lists as I. darvasica Regel].
- Mathew, B. 1981. The Iris. 62.
- Rechinger, K. H., ed. 1963–. Flora iranica.
