= Iris relicta =

Scientific classification
- Kingdom: Plantae
- Clade: Tracheophytes
- Clade: Angiosperms
- Clade: Monocots
- Order: Asparagales
- Family: Iridaceae
- Genus: Iris
- Subgenus: Iris subg. Iris
- Section: Iris sect. Pogon
- Species: I. relicta

Binomial name
- Iris relicta Colas.

Synonyms
- Iris × germanica var. suaveolens N.Terracc.; Iris suaveolens (N.Terracc.) A.Terracc. [Illegitimate]

Species of plant

Iris relicta is a plant species within the genus Iris, and it belongs to the subgenus Iris as well. This rare rhizomatous perennial originates from the mountains of Italy. It is of medium size, bearing purple flowers adorned with white beards. While it is seldom cultivated as an ornamental plant in temperate regions, its history has been perplexing. Initially mistaken as a variety of Iris germanica, it was later recognized as a distinct species, though it shared a name with another bearded iris. The clarification of its taxonomy only occurred in 1996.

== Description ==
It is similar in form to Iris × germanica.

It is classed as a medium-sized bearded iris, and grows up to between 30–40 cm (12–16 in) tall. It has a branched stem.

Like other irises, it has 2 pairs of petals, 3 large sepals (outer petals), known as the 'falls' and 3 inner smaller petals (or tepals), known as the 'standards'. The flowers come in shades of purple, from red-purple, to blue-purple. In the centre of the falls is a 'beard', or line of white hairs.

After the iris has flowered, it produces a seed capsule, that has not been described.

=== Biochemistry ===
As most irises are diploid, having two sets of chromosomes, this can be used to identify hybrids and classification of groupings. It has a chromosome count of 2n=40. It was counted by Colasante & Sauer in 1993 and by Colasante in 1996.

It is the same as Iris setina, Iris bicapitata, Iris lutescens and Iris revoluta.

== Taxonomy ==
The Latin specific epithet relicta refers to a remnant, primitive, left behind and relict. This name was chosen due to the diminishing size of the population of irises found on the mountains in Italy.

It was first published and described by Nicola Terracciano (1837–1921) as Iris germanica var. suaveolens in 'Atti dell' Accademia delle Scienze Fisiche e' Matematiche (Atti Accad. Sci. Fis.) series 4, (Appendix 2) on page 7 in 1890, as a variety of Iris germanica. It was then published as Iris suaveolens by (N. Terracc.) N. Terracc. ex A. Terracc in 'Nuovo Giorn. Bot. Ital.', series. 2, on page182 in 1894. But this name was rejected by other authors and iris authorities as it was already used by another iris species, since 1853.

Later it was re-classified as a separate species by Prof. Maretta Colasante in Giornale Botanico Italiano ('Giorn. Bot. Ital.') Vol.123 Supplement 1 on page 112 in 1989, and then called Iris relicta by Colasante in (Fl. Medit.) Vol.6 page 214 in 1996. Based on specimens found on 'Monte delle Fate' in Lazio, Italy.

It was verified by United States Department of Agriculture and the Agricultural Research Service on 7 April 2003, and the updated on 3 December 2004.

It is listed in the Encyclopedia of Life, and in the Catalogue of Life, it is listed as Iris relicta and notes that Iris germanica var. suaveolens is a synonym.

== Distribution and habitat ==
It is native to Europe.

=== Range ===
It is found in Italy, within the central and southern regions. It is found in the region of Lazio on 'Monte della Fate', within the Ausoni Mountains. and near Lago di Fondi.

It is listed as endemic of Italy, with Iris bicapitata, 'Iris italica var. cengialti' (a synonym of Iris pallida subsp. cengialti), Iris marsica, Iris revoluta, Iris sabina and Iris setina.

=== Habitat ===
It grows on the rocky mountain-sides with other small shrubs.

They can be found at an altitude of 1,100 m (3,600 ft) above sea level.

==== Synecology ====
Part of the Ausoni Mountains are protected by Wilderness Area, (covering 4,230 hectares and was established in 1999), forests (made of oak, cork oak and maple), cover most of the mountain valleys. Under the forest trees are rare and endemic flora, including Crocus imperati subsp imperati, Narcissus poeticus, Asphodeline lutea (Asfodelina), Daphne oleoides (spatula Daphne) and Iris relicta.

== Conservation ==
It is listed as 'very rare', and is protected in the 'Wilderness Area' in Italy.

== Cultivation ==
It is hardy to USDA Zone 7, tolerating dry Mediterranean-like summers.

=== Propagation ===
Irises can generally be propagated by division, or by seed growing.

== Toxicity ==
Like many other irises, most parts of the plant are poisonous (rhizome and leaves), and if mistakenly ingested can cause stomach pains and vomiting. Handling the plant may cause skin irritation or an allergic reaction.
