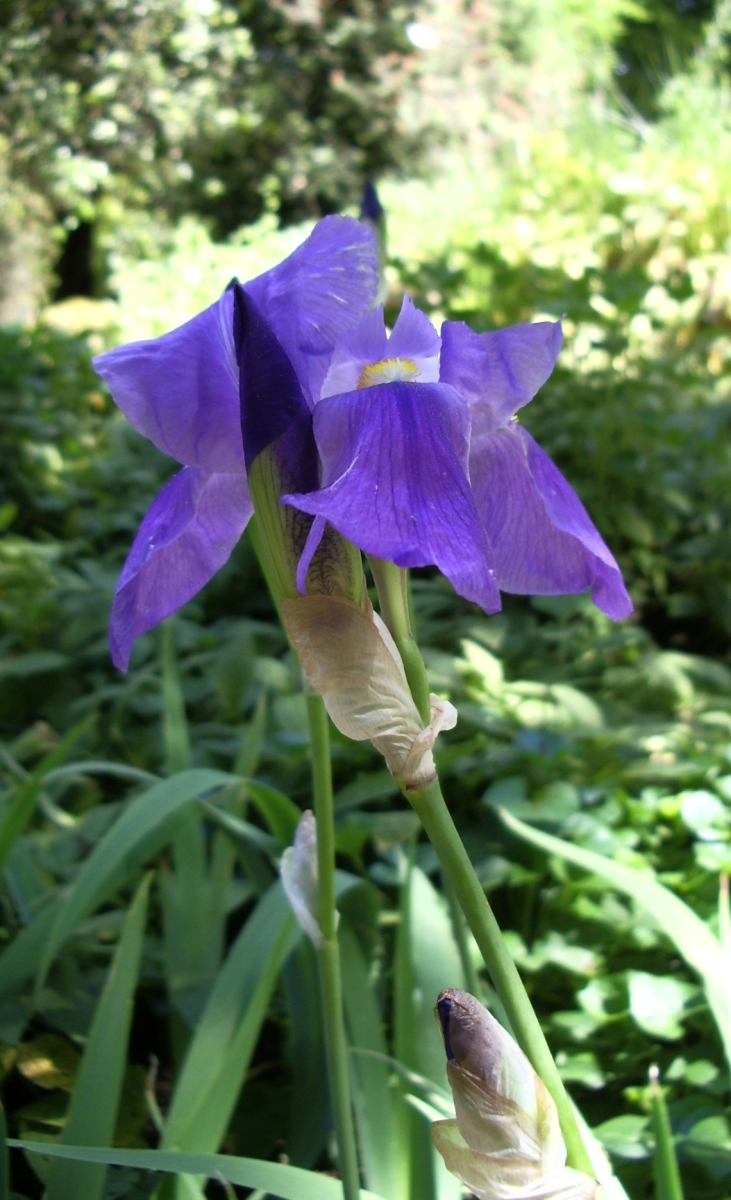

Scientific classification
- Kingdom: Plantae
- Clade: Embryophytes
- Clade: Tracheophytes
- Clade: Spermatophytes
- Clade: Angiosperms
- Clade: Monocots
- Order: Asparagales
- Family: Iridaceae
- Genus: Iris
- Species: I. pallida
- Subspecies: I. p. subsp. illyrica

Trinomial name
- Iris pallida subsp. illyrica (Tomm. ex Vis.) K.Richt.

Synonyms
- Iris cengialti subsp. illyrica (Fiori) Poldini; Iris illyrica Tomm. ex Vis.; Iris pallida f. dalmatica (Pamp.) Pamp.; Iris pseudopallida Trinajstic; Iris pseudopallida f. dalmatica (Pamp.) Trinajstic; Iris pseudopallida f. transiens Trinajstic

= Iris pallida subsp. illyrica =

Species of plant

Iris pallida subsp. illyrica, synonym Iris pseudopallida, (the southern Adriatic iris) is a subspecies of Iris pallida. It is a rhizomatous perennial from Croatia. It has flat, curved of sickle-shaped leaves, tall slender stems, 3–8 fragrant flowers, in shades of violet, or pale violet flowers, mauve, lavender, purple, yellow or white, between May and June. The iris was originally thought to be a separate species, but later classified as subspecies of Iris pallida, although in Croatia, it is still known as Iris pseudopallida. It is cultivated as an ornamental plant in temperate regions, especially in the Balkan regions.

== Description ==
It has a bluish coloured rhizome, and has flat, curved, or sickle-shaped leaves. The leaves can grow up to 35 cm (14 in) long, and up to 3 cm wide. They can survive the winter. It has a slender stem or peduncles, that can grow up to between 60–100 cm (24–39 in) tall. It has branches (or pedicels) near top of the plant. The stem has (scarious) membranous, (or translucent) spathes (leaves of the flower bud). Similar to Iris illyrica, the spathes can have a dirty, rusty markings. The stems (and the branches) hold between 3 and 8 flowers, between May and June. The fragrant flowers, come in shades of violet, or pale violet flowers, mauve, lavender, purple, yellow or white. Like other irises, it has 2 pairs of petals, 3 large sepals (outer petals), known as the 'falls' and 3 inner, smaller petals (or tepals), known as the 'standards'. The falls are bent backwards, they have a light brown edge and reddish purple veins. They also have a thick strip of yellow hairs (the 'beard') in the centre. The flowers has dry, spheroidal pollen, that are 51–100 μm large. After the iris has flowered, it produces a seed capsule, that has 5 mm long seeds.

=== Biochemistry ===
In 2001, a karyologic study was carried out on various irises in the Alpine-Dinaric region (relating to the Dinaric Alps mountain chain), which included in addition Iris cengialti, Iris illyrica and Iris pallida. It found that the mitotic number of chromosomes of most species was 2n=24. As most irises are diploid, having two sets of chromosomes, this can be used to identify hybrids and classification of groupings.

In 2003, a study was carried out on flavonoids within the leaves of Iris illyrica and Iris pallida subsp. illyrica. It found significant quantitative differences in the leaf flavonoid patterns.

== Taxonomy ==
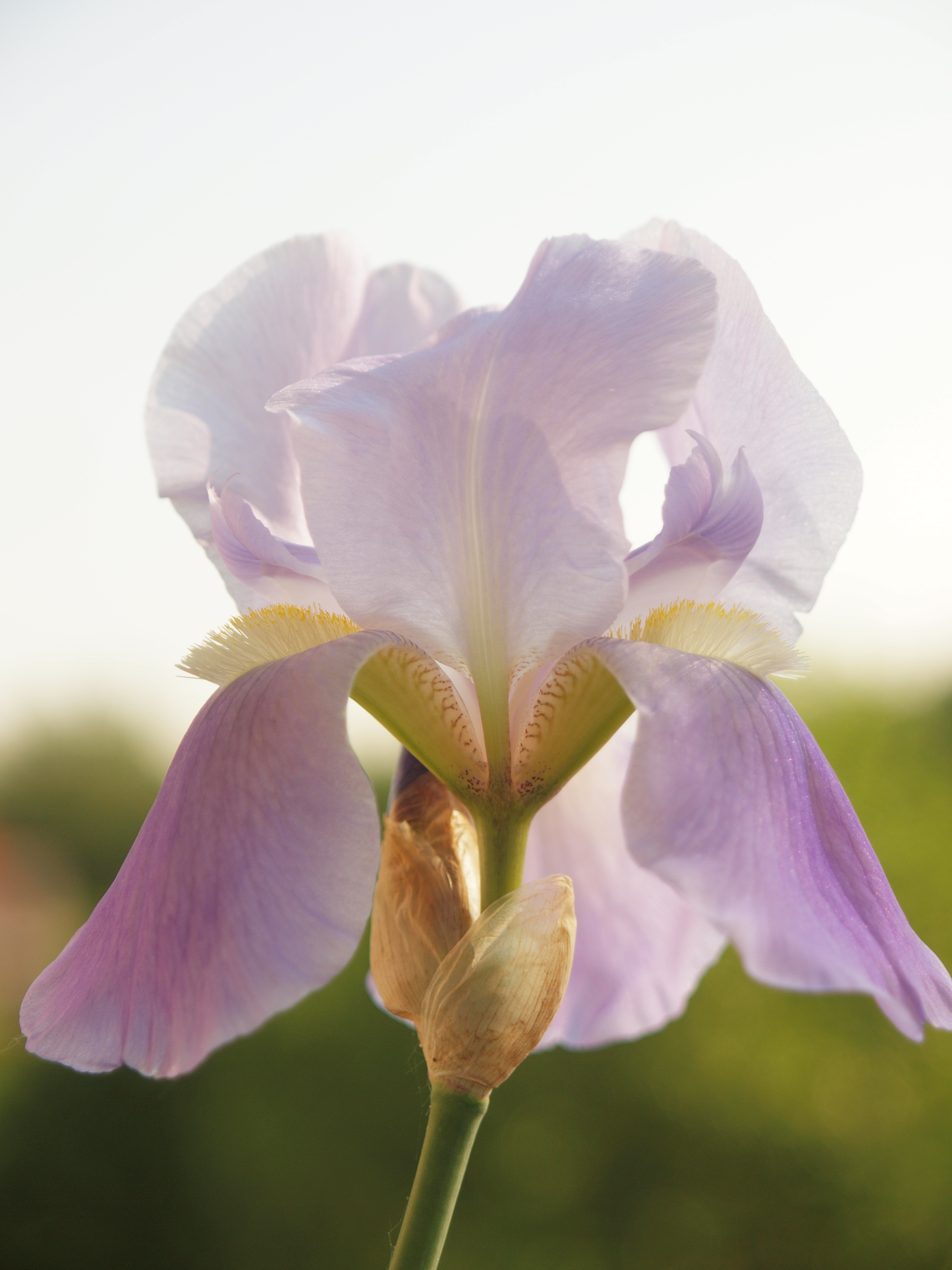
Wild plant growing near Niksic in Montenegro

It is commonly known as the southern Adriatic iris, It is also known in Croatia as jadranska perunika meaning Adriatic iris.

It was first collected by Ivo Trinajstić on 1 May 1973, and then it was first published and described in 1976. Trinajstić treated the plant as a separate species to Iris pallida due to the difference in spathes. Iris pallida typically has silvery white spathes while Iris illyrica and Iris pallida subsp. illyrica have spathes that have a dirty pale rusty tint. In 1991, Nikolic and Mitic also found that the size and shape of epidermal cells and stoma, was another difference, but these could be down to habitat effects.

It was also thought to be related to Iris reichenbachii, but a study on Iris orjenii found various differences. Often plants are called one name and are later changed due to a new study.

Later, the species was classified as a subspecies of Iris pallida, Iris pallida subsp. pseudopallida. Although, in Croatia, it is still known as Iris pseudopallida.

== Distribution and habitat ==
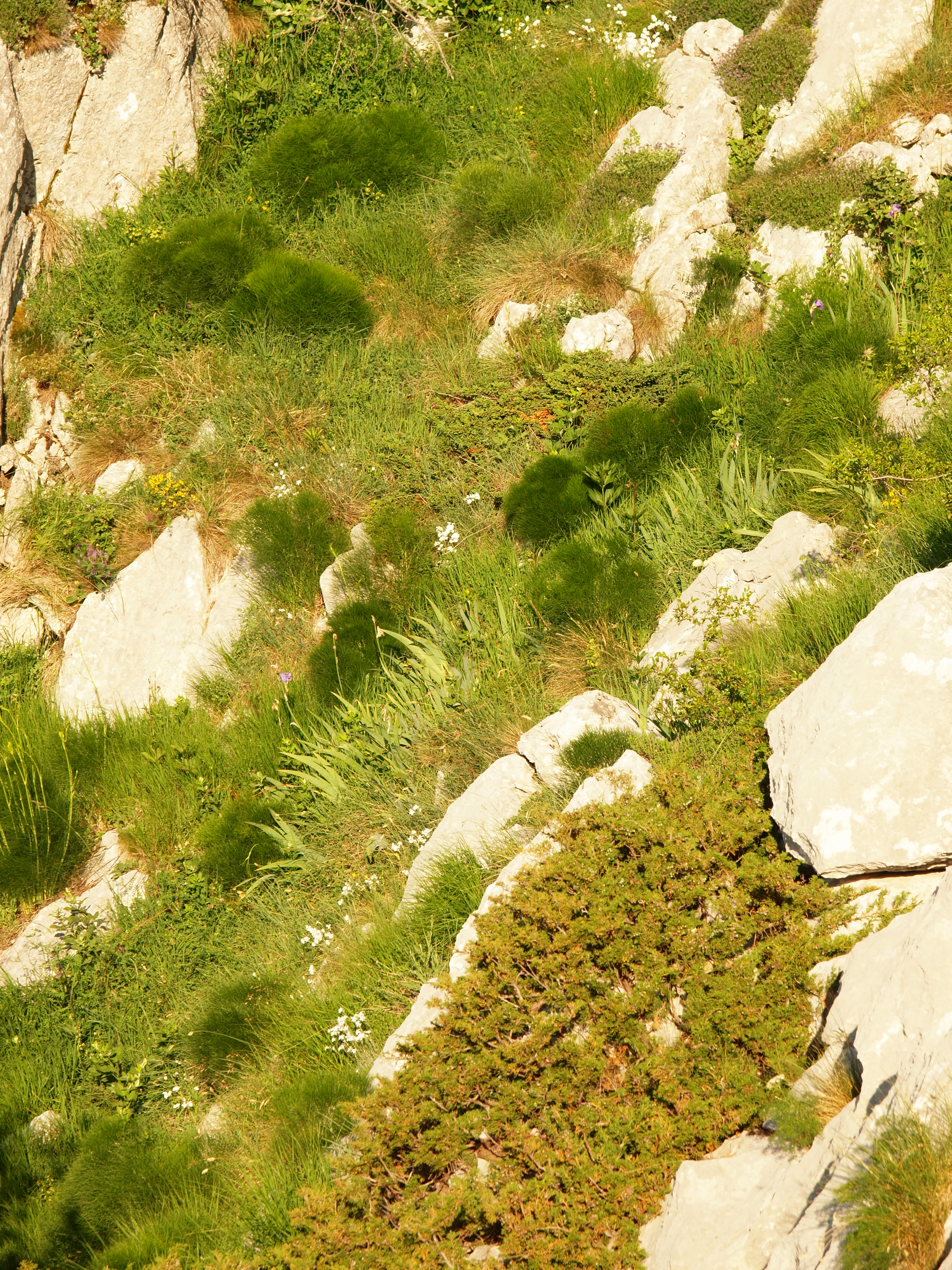
Wild iris growing on Mount Orjen, Montenegro

It is native to Southern Europe.

=== Range ===
It is found along the Adriatic Coast, of the Balkan Peninsula. In Montenegro, Herzegovina, in Croatia, (including south Dalmatia,) and also in Albania.

It is normally found in Croatia along with Iris reichenbachii, another endemic iris.

=== Habitat ===
It grows on rocks (made of limestone or karst), dry meadows or pastures.

They can be found at an altitude above 600 m (2,000 ft), above sea level.

== Conservation ==
It has large colonies of plants, but they may be under risk from collection.

== Cultivation ==
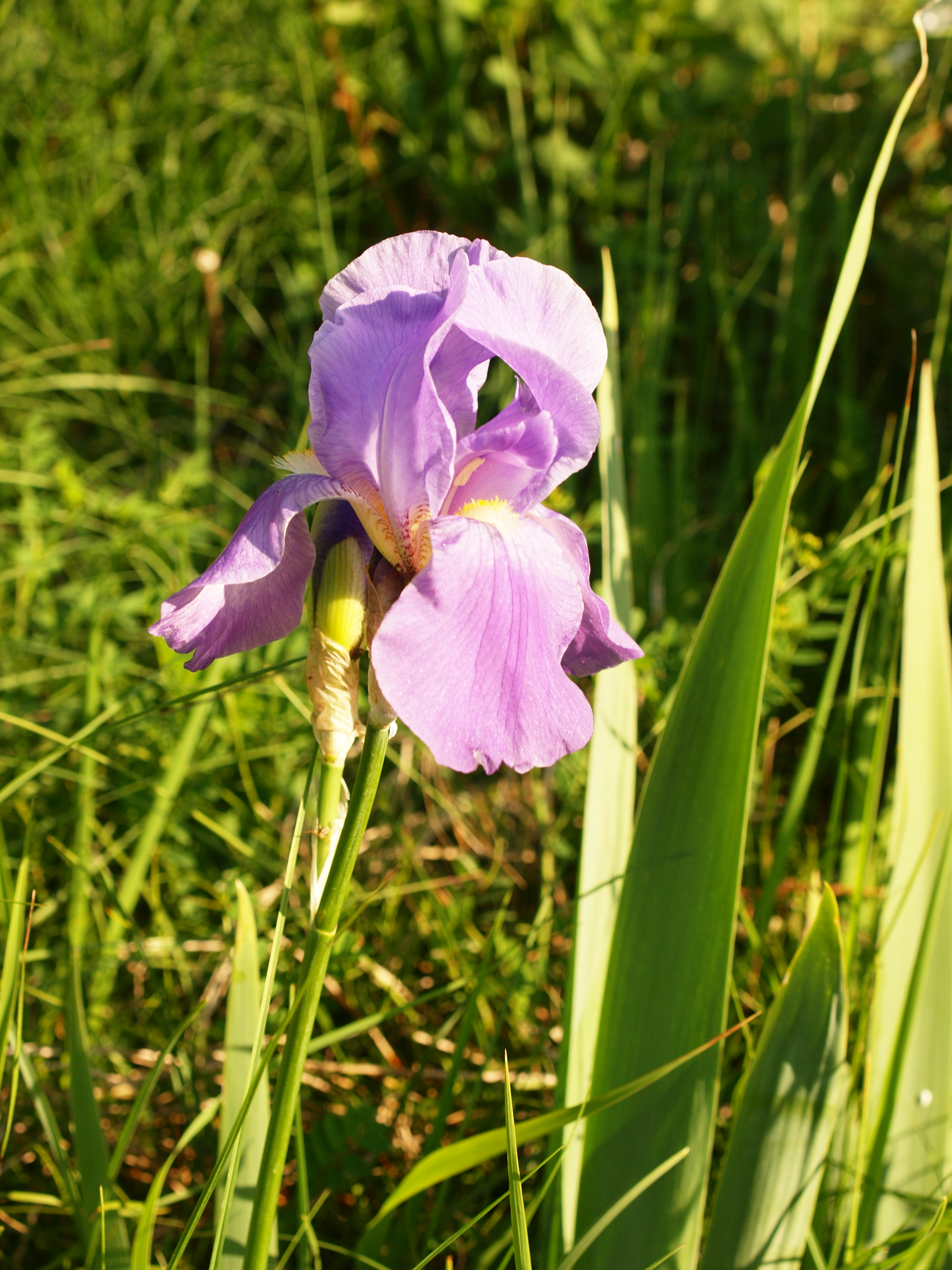
Growing in the wild in Montengero

The plants are grown in gardens in Croatia and surrounding countries, and are also available for cultivation elsewhere, used in garden borders.

It can be found in the Biokovo Botanical Garden Kotišina.

=== Propagation ===
Irises can generally be propagated by division, or by seed growing.

== Toxicity ==
Like many other irises, most parts of the plant are poisonous (rhizome and leaves), if mistakenly ingested can cause stomach pains and vomiting. Also handling the plant may cause a skin irritation or an allergic reaction.
