= Giardino Botanico della Majella =

Botanical garden in Italy

Coordinates: 42°09′58″N 14°12′59″E

The Giardino Botanico della Majella (3500 m^{2}), also known as the Giardino Botanico Michele Tenore, is a botanical garden located in the Majella National Park (Parco Nazionale della Majella) at Via Colle della Madonna I-66010, Lama dei Peligni, Province of Chieti, Abruzzo, Italy. It is open daily; an admission fee is charged.

The garden was established in 1995, and named in honor of botanist Michele Tenore. It now contains about 500 varieties of plants, on a site of 9000 square meters.

It is organized into four sections as follows:

- Flowers and vegetation of Majella
- Plants of economic importance
- Endangered plants of Abruzzo - including Adonis vernalis, Astragalus aquilanus, Centaurea sphaerocephala, Crocus reticulatus, Goniolimon italicum, Iris marsica, Phlomis fruticosa, Pinus nigra var. di Fara San Martino, Salvia officinalis var. angustifolia, Stachys thirkey, Salix foetida, and Salix pentandra.
- Heritage agricultural plants

== See also ==
- List of botanical gardens in Italy

== Other sources ==
- Giardino Botanico "Michele Tenore" (Italian)
- Giardino Botanico della Majella (Italian)
