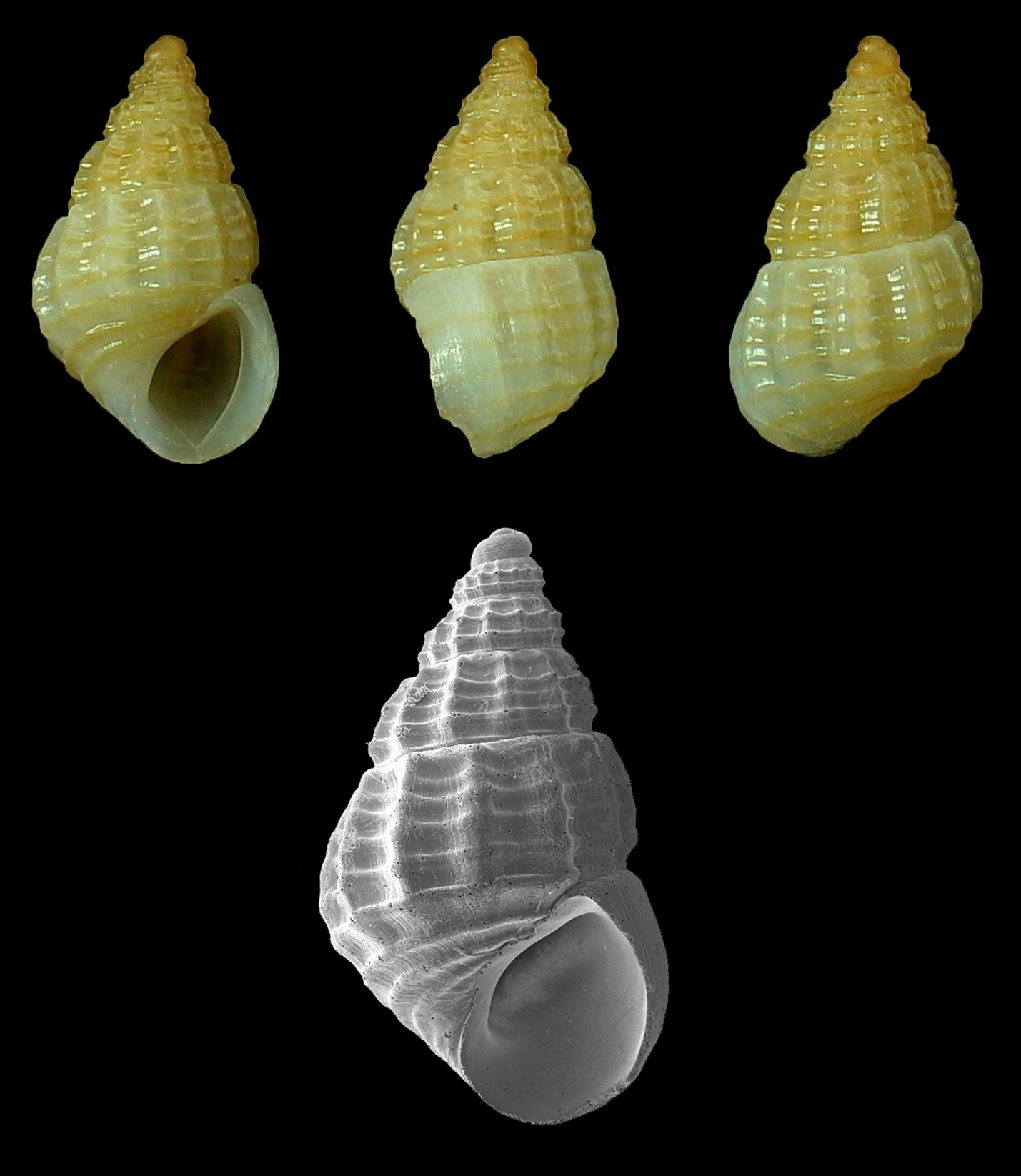
- Shell of Alvania rominae (holotype at MNHN, Paris)

Scientific classification
- Kingdom: Animalia
- Phylum: Mollusca
- Class: Gastropoda
- Subclass: Caenogastropoda
- Order: Littorinimorpha
- Superfamily: Rissooidea
- Family: Rissoidae
- Genus: Alvania
- Species: A. rominae

Binomial name
- Alvania rominae Amati, Trono & Oliverio, 2020

= Alvania rominae =

Species of gastropod

Alvania rominae is a species of small sea snail, a marine gastropod mollusk or micromollusk in the family Rissoidae.

== Taxonomy ==
Alvania rominae was described by Italian malacologists Bruno Amati & Daniele Trono and Italian zoologist Marco Oliverio in 2020 based on a specimen collected at a depth of 58 meters (177 feet) in the Gulf of Taranto in the Ionian Sea, near the city of Gallipolli, Italy. The species name, rominae, comes from the first name of Trono's wife.

== Description ==
The shell of Alvania rominae is 3.5 mm in length and 2.05 mm in diameter. It is pale yellow in color, with some individuals having brown or white shells.

== Distribution ==
This marine species occurs in the Ionian Sea, off the coasts of southern Apulia. It has been collected at depths ranging from 35 meters (115 feet) to 58 meters (177 feet), and in waters ranging from about 8 kilometers (5 miles) to about 34 kilometers (21 miles) from the shore near Otranto, Sant'Isidoro, and Porto Cesareo, all within the province of Lecce.
