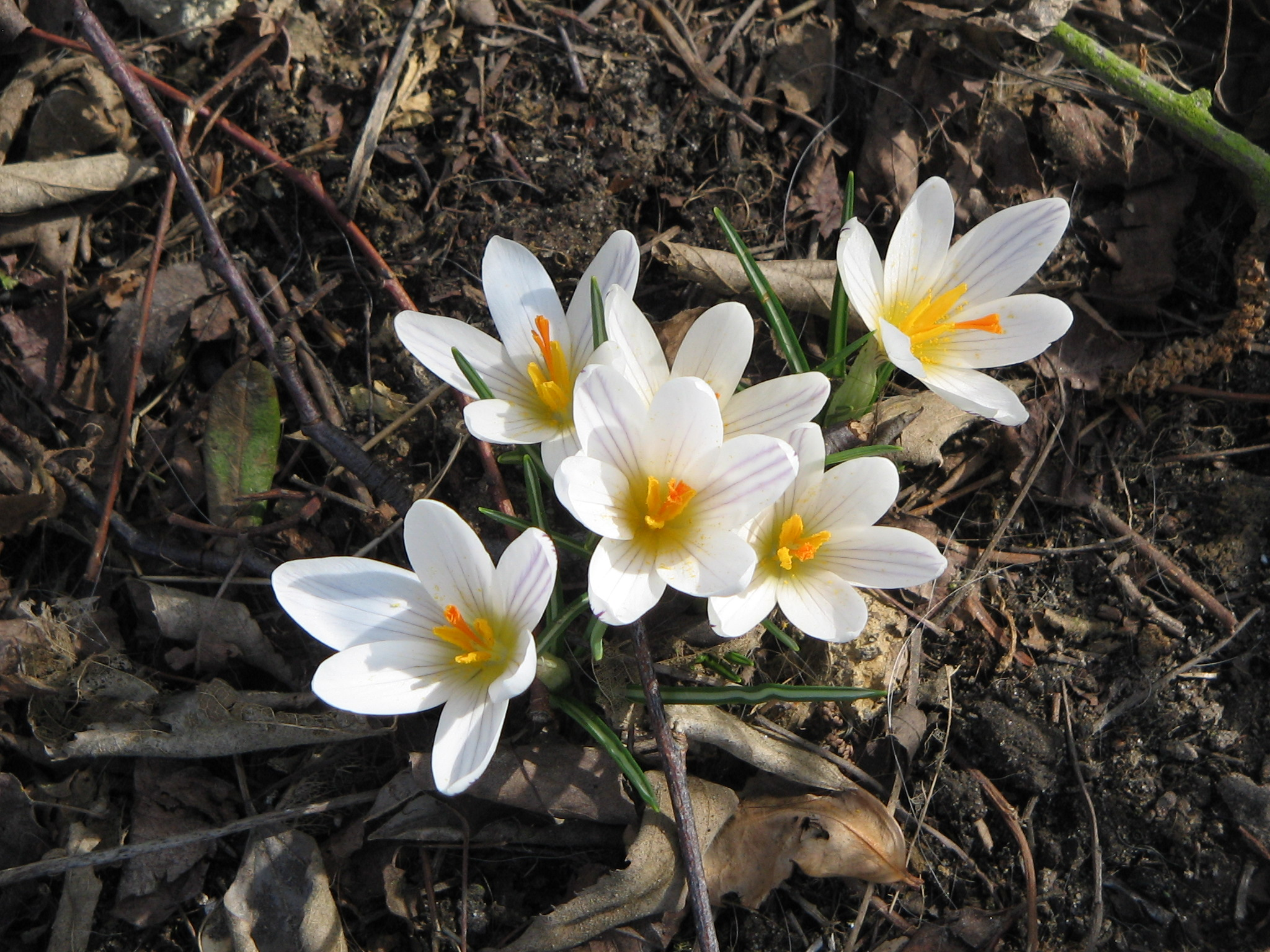

Scientific classification
- Kingdom: Plantae
- Clade: Embryophytes
- Clade: Tracheophytes
- Clade: Spermatophytes
- Clade: Angiosperms
- Clade: Monocots
- Order: Asparagales
- Family: Iridaceae
- Genus: Crocus
- Species: C. versicolor

Binomial name
- Crocus versicolor Ker Gawl.

Synonyms
- Crocus crestensis Eugène; Crocus fragrans Haw.; Crocus meridionalis Risso; Crocus reinwardtii Rchb.; Crocus subapenninus Herb.

= Crocus versicolor =

Species of flowering plant

Crocus versicolor is a species of flowering plant in the genus Crocus of the family Iridaceae, found in southeast France, Monaco, and northwestern Italy.

The flower is white, lilac, and purple, often with external stripes.

In wild habitat, it is often found in stony and grassy places.

Flowering occurs from February to April, it is found growing in scrub environments and among rocks to an elevation of 1200 meters.

Its closest relatives are Crocus imperati and Crocus malyi.
