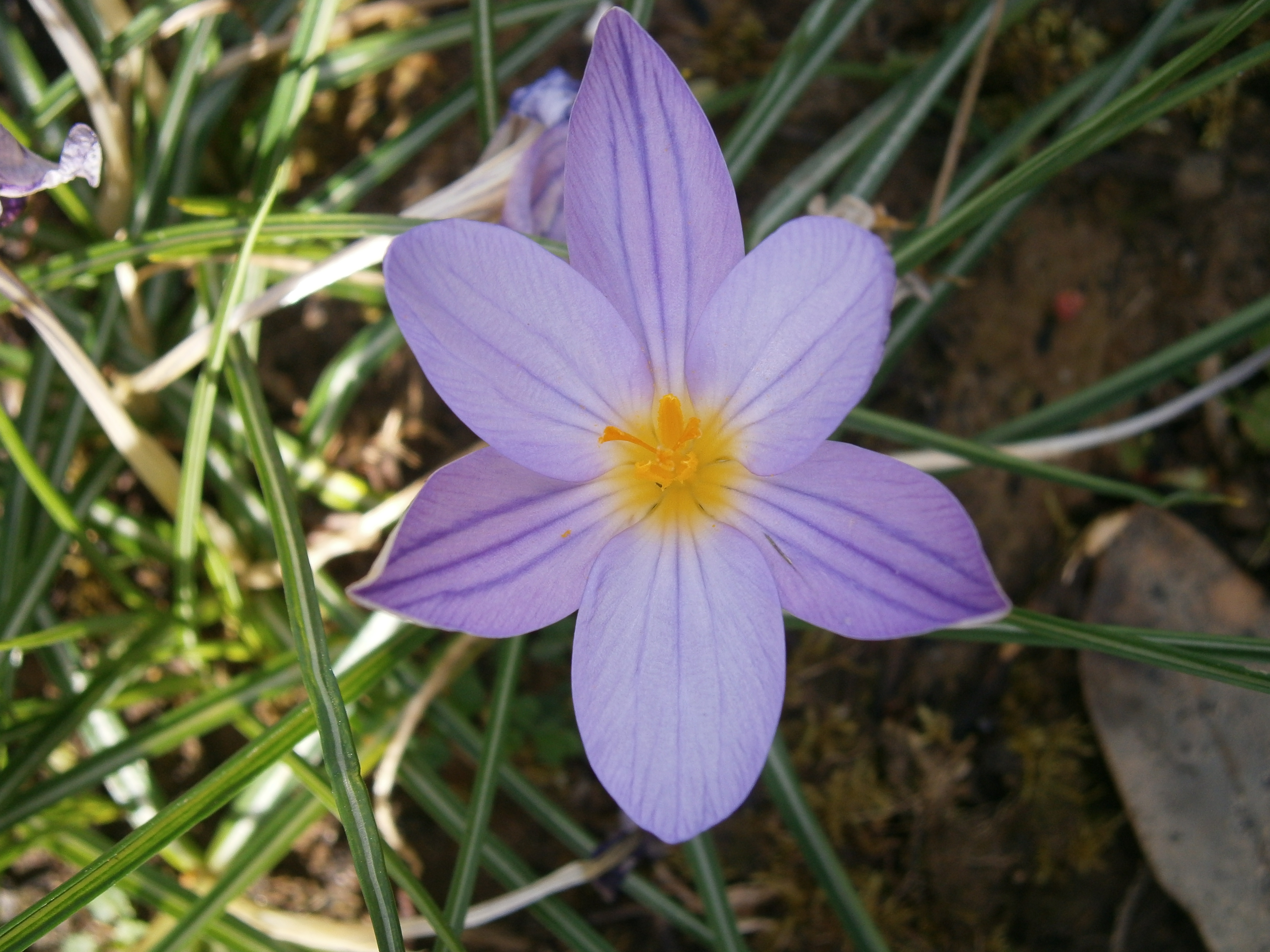

Scientific classification
- Kingdom: Plantae
- Clade: Tracheophytes
- Clade: Angiosperms
- Clade: Monocots
- Order: Asparagales
- Family: Iridaceae
- Genus: Crocus
- Species: C. imperati

Binomial name
- Crocus imperati Ten.

Synonyms
- Crocus albiflorus subsp. neapolitanus (Ker Gawl.) Suess.; Crocus imperati var. albiflorus Ten.; Crocus imperati var. reidii Maw; Crocus imperatonianus Herb. [Illegitimate]; Crocus imperatonianus var. albus Herb.; Crocus imperatonianus var. montanus Herb.; Crocus imperatonianus var. rupestris Herb.; Crocus incurvus Donn ex Steud.; Crocus neapolitanus (Ker Gawl.) Ten. [Illegitimate]; Crocus recurvus Haw.; Crocus reflexus Donn; Crocus vernus var. neapolitanus Ker Gawl.

= Crocus imperati =

Species of flowering plant

Crocus imperati is a species of flowering plant in the genus Crocus of the family Iridaceae, endemic to Italy.

Its flowering time is winter and early spring. Its features are lilac flowers with a dark purple outside.

Its closest relative is Crocus versicolor.

It is one of the most debated endemic crocuses in Italy as it has been interpreted by various authors as different species or infraspecific entities.

== Etymology ==
Crocus is the middle English word for “saffron plant". Its Italian origin has given it the name in Swedish "Neapelkrokus" - Crocus from Napoli.
