= Francesco Ambrosi =

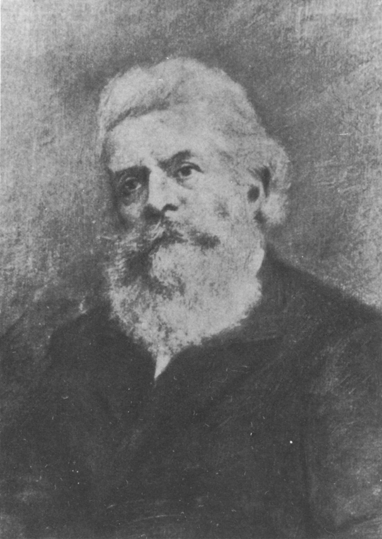
Francesco Ambrosi

Francesco Ambrosi (November 17, 1821 – 9 April 1897) was an Italian botanist, librarian, ethnologist and historian. The standard author abbreviation Ambrosi is used to indicate this person as the author when citing a botanical name.

== Biography ==
Ambrosi was born to a family of herders in Borgo Valsugana, the present day Italian province of Trentino – at that time part of the (Princely) County of Tyrol, a crown land of the Austrian Empire. He was not able to attend school, but he pursued self-taught studies in the natural sciences, history, philosophy and, in particular, botany. He devoted himself to botany by studying under Francesco Angelo Facchini and Casimiro Sartorelli, focusing on the flora of the Trentino region.

He published many scientific works, notably, in 1851, Prospetto delle specie zoologiche conosciute nel Trentino. In 1853 he married Elisa Zanollo, and the couple would have eight children together, though five of died in infancy. In 1854 he began publishing the journal La flora del Tirolo meridionale, which was discontinued in 1857 before he was able to complete the detailed list, after a fire destroyed his house in the city of Trento, including all his archives and collections.

In 1864, Ambrosi was appointed director of both the Trento Public Library and the adjoining Trento Museum of Natural Sciences. In that role, he was able to facilitate a series of initiatives, including the establishment of a chair for the teaching of Italian history and literature in 1869, and the publication of the periodical Historical Archive for Istria, Trieste and Trento from 1881. He became close friends with Fortunato Vincenzo Zeni, one of the founders of the Museo civico di Rovereto, and worked with German scholar Theodor Mommsen to expand his expertise on, and organize his collection of epigraphs.

Ambrosi's work at the library and museum could consume his attention for the remaining decades of his life, reducing his study of botany while increasing his focus on history, geography and anthropology. He facilitated the expansion of the library to a collection of forty thousand volumes.

Because of his patriotic and pro-Italian sentiments, in 1881 Ambrosi was tried, by the Austro-Hungarian government, on charges of breaking press laws, for holding in the library a volume censored by the public security authorities.

Ambrosi was a member of several scientific, cultural, national and international institutions, including the Société botanique de France, the Accademia Roveretana degli Agiati in nearby Rovereto, and the Società degli Alpinisti Tridentini. He also became interested in zoology, writing some memoirs about birds and an important treatise on the Trentino bear.

Ambrosi left his duties in late 1896, suffering from cardiovascular disease, which led to his death on April 9, 1897.

== See also ==
- List of botanists by author abbreviation
