= Porto Cesareo =

- Comune
- Comune di Porto Cesareo
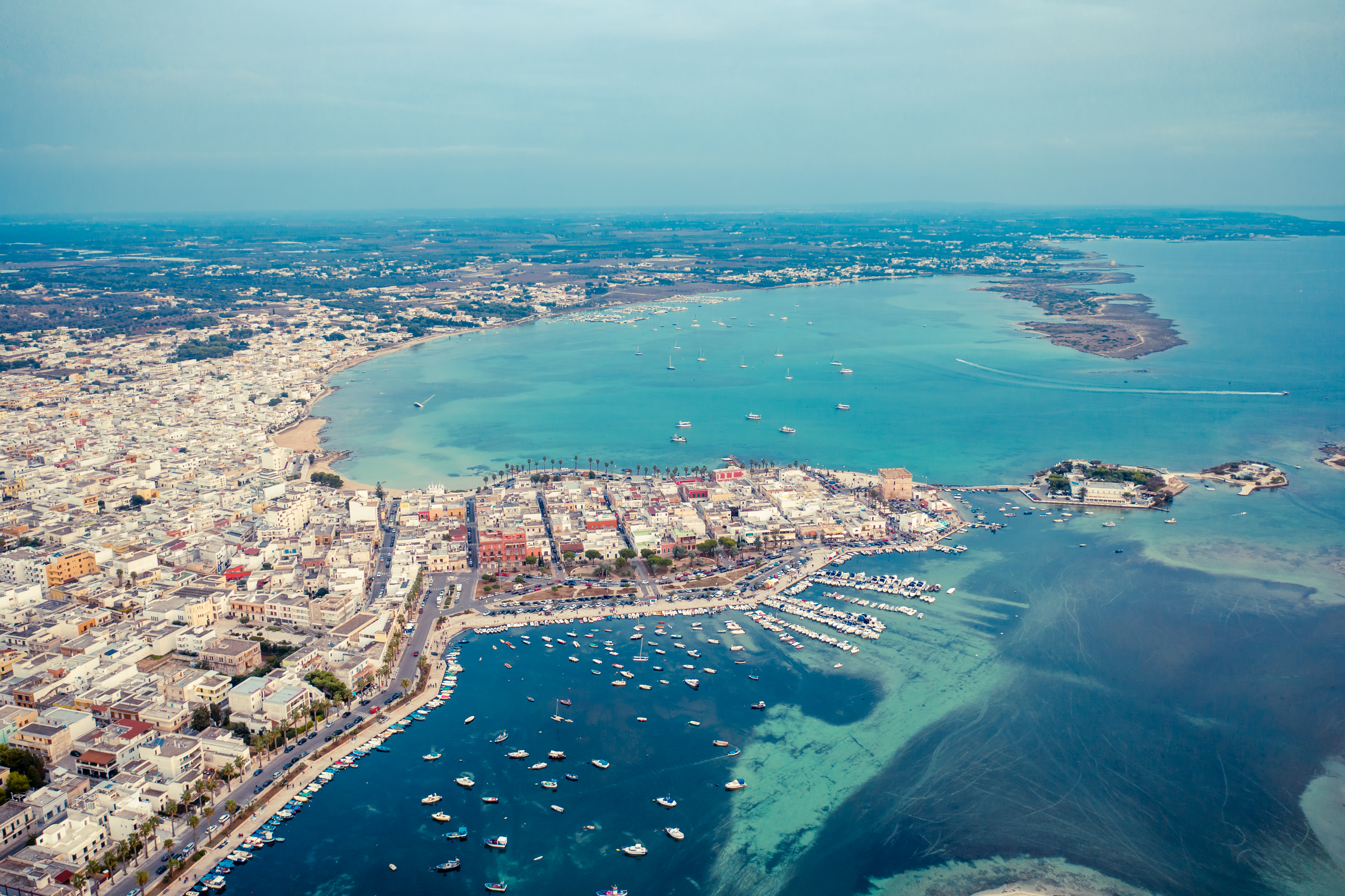

- Location within Italy Location within Apulia
- Coordinates: 40°15′48″N 17°54′04″E
- Country: Italy
- Region: Apulia
- Province: Lecce (LE)
- Frazioni: Torre Lapillo

Government
  - Mayor: Salvatore Albano

Area
  - Total: 34 km^{2} (13 sq mi)
- Elevation: 1 m (3.3 ft)

Population (30 June 2012)
  - Total: 5,930
  - Density: 170/km^{2} (450/sq mi)
- Demonym: Cesarini
- Time zone: UTC+1 (CET)
  - Summer (DST): UTC+2 (CEST)
- Postal code: 73010
- Dialing code: 0833
- ISTAT code: 075097
- Patron saint: Beata Vergine Maria
- Saint day: 23 August
- Website: Official website

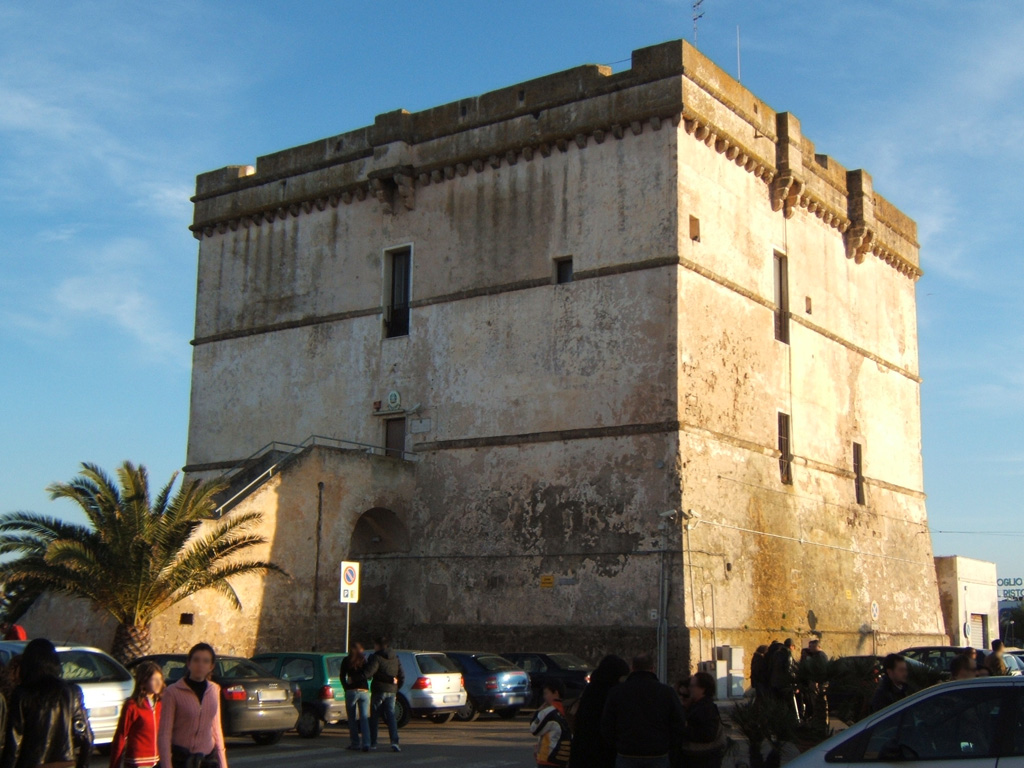
Torre Cesarea

Porto Cesareo (Italian pronunciation: [ˈpɔrto tʃeˈzaːreo]; Salentino: Cisaria) is a town and comune in the Italian province of Lecce in the Apulia region of south-east Italy.

The area around the sea of Porto Cesareo is an examplar of Maquis shrubland. Beyond the natural beauty, the sea of Porto Cesareo is useful for tourism thanks to the presence of a sandy bottom that remains low for tens of meters and more transparent waters recalling Caribbean atmospheres, as well as due to the large and very long beaches.

The coast is characterized by numerous capes, islets and reefs. Particularly important among these are: the large island, also known as the Isola dei Conigli ("Rabbits island"), Isola della Malva, Isola della Testa and Lo Scoglio.

The great natural and economic consequence of Porto Cesareo wealth is still represented by the totality of its sea, so valuable that a National Marine Park was established for its protection. In 1971, professor P. Parenzan (from the Museum of Marine Biology) collected Iris revoluta (a rare species of Iris) on the islet of Mojuso near Porto Cesareo in the gulf of Taranto.
