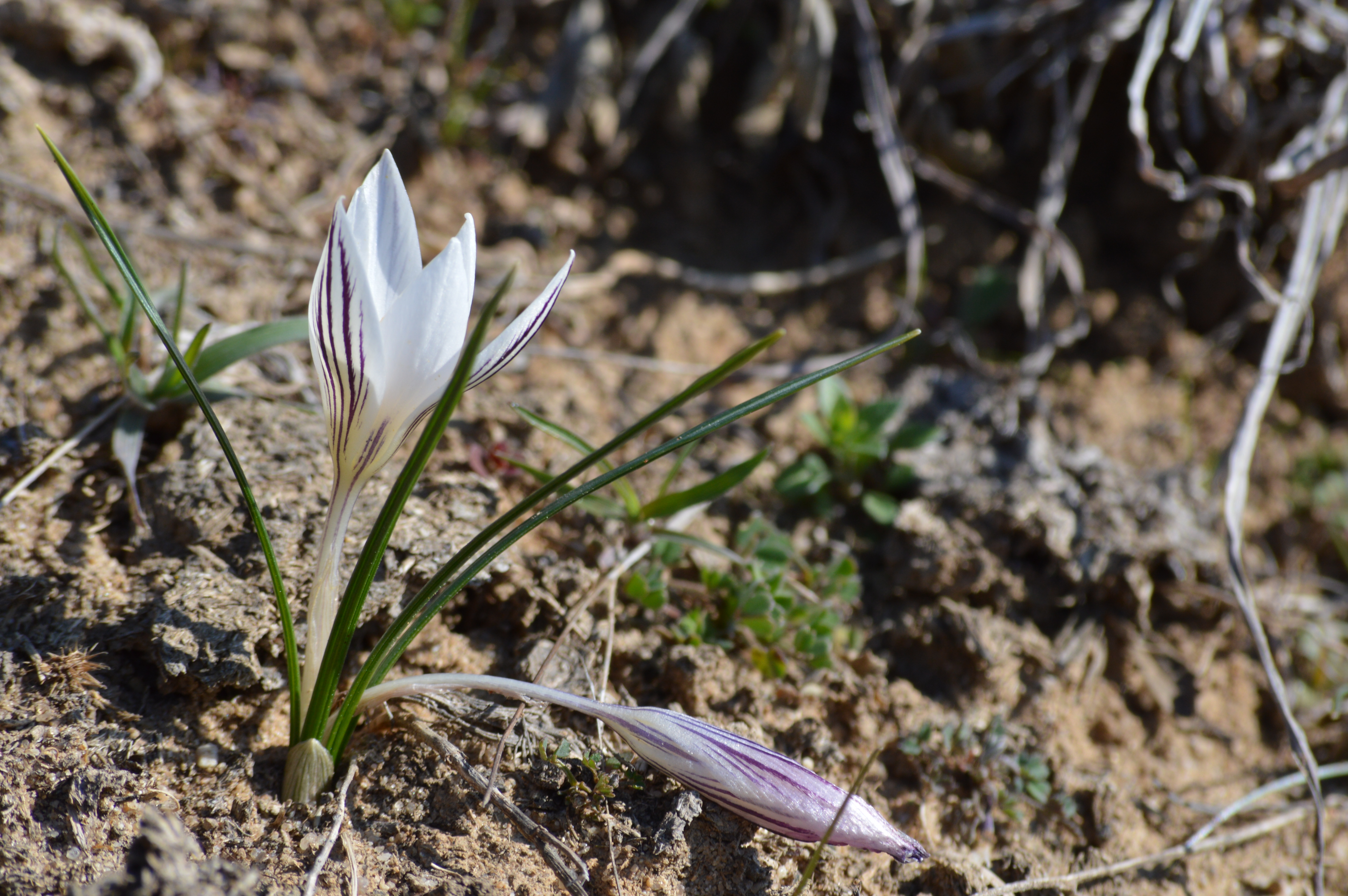

Scientific classification
- Kingdom: Plantae
- Clade: Tracheophytes
- Clade: Angiosperms
- Clade: Monocots
- Order: Asparagales
- Family: Iridaceae
- Genus: Crocus
- Species: C. reticulatus

Binomial name
- Crocus reticulatus Steven ex Adam

Synonyms
- Crocus luteus M.Bieb.

= Crocus reticulatus =

Species of flowering plant

Crocus reticulatus is a species of flowering plant in family Iridaceae. It is a cormous perennial native to central and southern European Russia, the northern Caucasus, the Transcaucasus, and Ukraine.

Crocus reticulatus is found growing in woods and meadows at elevations up to 2,000 meters, and flowering occurs February though April.
