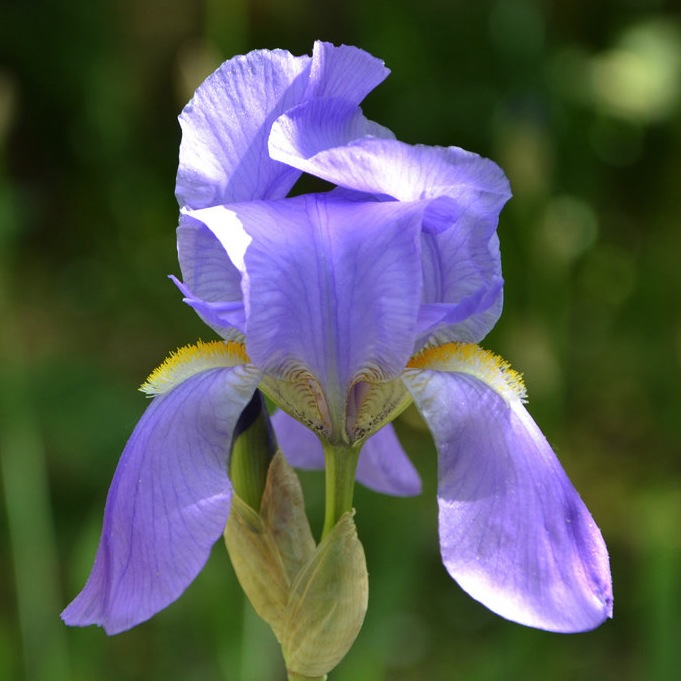

Scientific classification
- Kingdom: Plantae
- Clade: Tracheophytes
- Clade: Angiosperms
- Clade: Monocots
- Order: Asparagales
- Family: Iridaceae
- Genus: Iris
- Subgenus: Iris subg. Iris
- Section: Iris sect. Iris
- Species: I. pallida

Binomial name
- Iris pallida Lam.

Synonyms
- Iris × australis var. mandraliscae (Tod.) Nyman; Iris × australis var. tinaei (Tod.) Nyman; Iris desertorum Balb. [Illegitimate]; Iris fulgida Berg; Iris × germanica subsp. pallida (Lam.) O.Bolòs & Vigo; Iris glauca Salisb.; Iris gloriosa Reider ex Berg; Iris hortensis Tausch; Iris mandraliscae Tod.; Iris marchesettii Pamp.; Iris moggridgei Baker; Iris odoratissima Jacq.; Iris pallida subsp. mandraliscae (Tod.) K.Richt.; Iris pallida var. odoratissima (Jacq.) Nyman; Iris pallida subsp. pallida (unknown); Iris pallida var. rosea Prodán; Iris pallida subsp. sicula (Tod.) K.Richt.; Iris pallida subsp. tinaei (Tod.) K.Richt.; Iris pallidecaerulaea Pers.; Iris picta Spreng. [Illegitimate]; Iris plicata Lam.; Iris propendens Lange; Iris sicula Tod.; Iris swertii Lam.; Iris tinaei Tod.

= Iris pallida =

Species of flowering plant

Iris pallida, the Dalmatian iris or sweet iris, is a hardy flowering perennial plant of the genus Iris, family Iridaceae. It is native to the Dalmatian coast (Croatia) but widely naturalised elsewhere. It is a member of the subgenus Iris, meaning that it is a bearded iris, and grows from a rhizome. It adapts well to different environments and is used in many different ways.

== Description ==
This iris prefers rocky places in the Mediterranean and Submediterranean zone and reaches sometimes montane regions at its southern range in Montenegro. It grows to a stem height of 50–80 cm (20–31 in). The leaves are bluish-green in color, and sword-shaped, 40–50 cm (16–20 in) in length, and 2.5–3 cm (0.98–1.18 in) in width. The inflorescence, produced in May/June, is fan-shaped and contains two or three flowers, which are usually pale purplish to whitish.

== Cultivation ==
Iris pallida is cultivated in the Chianti region of Italy for its fragrance and medicinal properties. It is grown as a garden plant and commercially for the extraction of essential oils from its rhizome (orris root) which was historically used for medicinal purposes. Orris oil is used to add flavor and scent to foods, gins, and perfumes

The species' successful cultivation is partly due to its ability to thrive in different environments, including different climates and nutrient-poor soils. Iris pallida growth and flowering differ in different temperatures. Iris pallida flowers last longer than other Iris species, but take longer to develop, especially in colder climates.

The variegated cultivar 'Variegata' has gained the Royal Horticultural Society's Award of Garden Merit.

== Uses ==
For hundreds of years, Iris pallida was used medicinally. It is used today to flavor foods and drinks as well as for perfumes or air fresheners, which dates back to the 15th century when orris was used to impart fresh scents on linens. The plant's rhizomes are also used to make beads for children's teething necklaces as well as rosary beads.

== Subspecies ==
Three subspecies of Iris pallida s.l. are recognised by some authors as species: Iris pallida subsp. cengialti, (with deep purplish flowers) from Slovenia and adjacent Italy, Iris pallida ssp. illyrica, from the North Dalmatian coast, and Iris pallida ssp. pseudopallida from the South Dalmatian coast.
