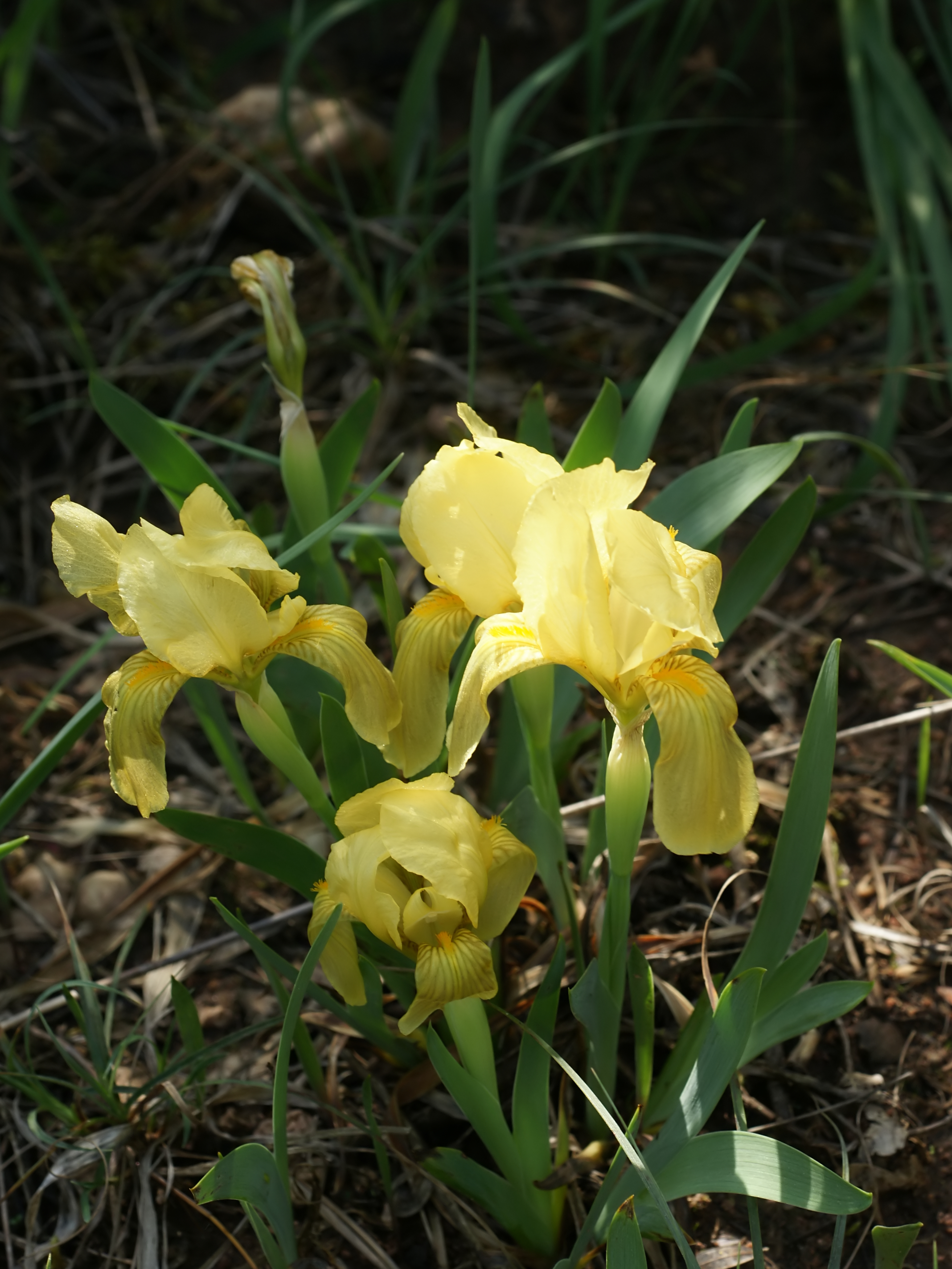
- Yellow form

Conservation status
- Least Concern (IUCN 3.1)

Scientific classification
- Kingdom: Plantae
- Clade: Embryophytes
- Clade: Tracheophytes
- Clade: Spermatophytes
- Clade: Angiosperms
- Clade: Monocots
- Order: Asparagales
- Family: Iridaceae
- Genus: Iris
- Subgenus: Iris subg. Iris
- Section: Iris sect. Iris
- Species: I. lutescens

Binomial name
- Iris lutescens Lam.

Synonyms
- Iris chamaeiris

= Iris lutescens =

Species of flowering plant

Iris lutescens, the Crimean iris or dwarf iris, is a rhizomatous flowering plant in the genus Iris. It is native to North East Spain, Southern France and Italy. It is found on rocky or sandy hillsides or in woodlands.

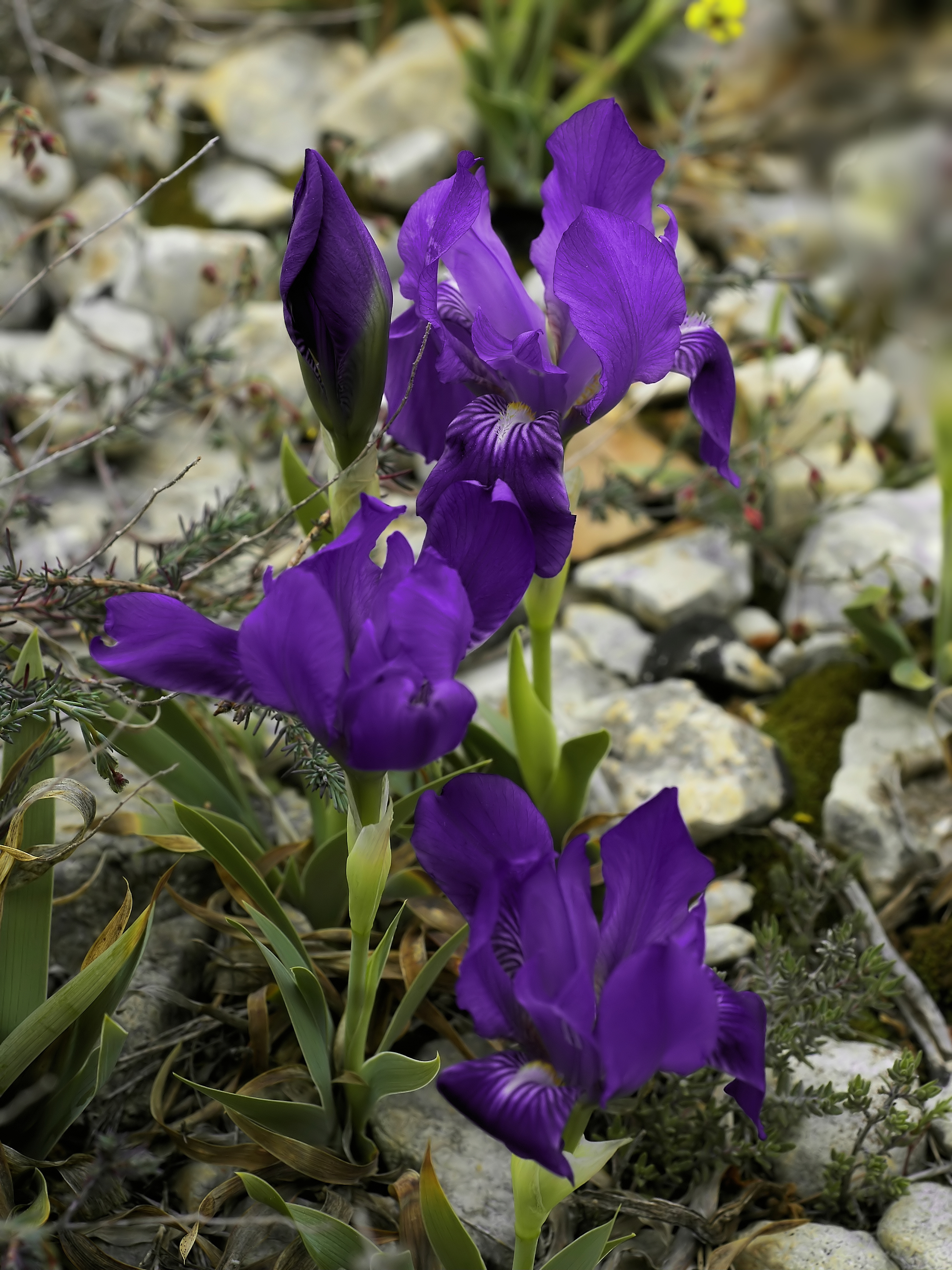

It grows up to 30 cm (12 in) tall, with broad leaves (about 2.5 cm (0.98 in) wide), producing yellow or violet flowers in spring (March–April). It prefers full sun, a slightly acid soil, and dry conditions during its dormant period in the summer. It is very hardy, down to −20 °C (−4 °F) or less.

This plant is cultivated as an ornamental plant in temperate regions. In the UK it has gained the Royal Horticultural Society's Award of Garden Merit.
