= Iris illyrica =

Scientific classification
- Kingdom: Plantae
- Clade: Embryophytes
- Clade: Tracheophytes
- Clade: Spermatophytes
- Clade: Angiosperms
- Clade: Monocots
- Order: Asparagales
- Family: Iridaceae
- Genus: Iris
- Subgenus: Iris subg. Iris
- Section: Iris sect. Iris
- Species: I. illyrica

Binomial name
- Iris illyrica Tomm.

Synonyms
- Iris pallida subsp. illyrica

Species of plant

Iris illyrica, the Illyrian iris, is a perennial plant from the iris family (Iridaceae), native to Southeastern Europe.

== Distribution ==
Its native range consists of much of the ancient region Illyria, for which it is named, located on the Balkan Peninsula.

It can be found growing wild in modern Slovenia, Dalmatia (Croatia), Albania, Kosovo, Bosnia and Herzegovina, Montenegro and parts of Serbia and North Macedonia.

== Description ==
Iris illyrica grows up to 40 cm in height.

Its flowering period is May and June.

Its best planting position is in full sun. The soil requirements are dry or average moist, fertile well drained soil. It is suitable in border and rock gardens. This plant produces seeds rarely. It produces usually ten seeds that ripen out in autumn.

=== Taxonomy ===
According to the IOPI (International Organization for Plant Information) the status of this plant is still unresolved; it is often treated as a subspecies of the Dalmatian iris (Iris pallida). It has been reclassified by some as a synonym of Iris pallida subsp. illyrica.

=== Medicinal plant ===
The Illyrians (and later the Romans) considered Iris illyrica a medicinal plant with various medicinal properties. These included the healing of boils and relief of headaches. The plant was also believed able to induce abortion. Parts were used in the ancient world as an anti-perspirant and for the manufacture of perfumes.
