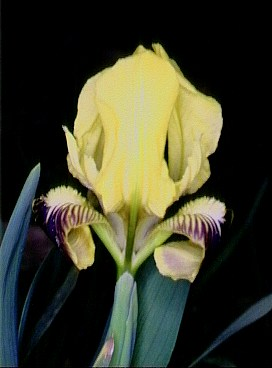

Conservation status
- Least Concern (IUCN 3.1)

Scientific classification
- Kingdom: Plantae
- Clade: Embryophytes
- Clade: Tracheophytes
- Clade: Spermatophytes
- Clade: Angiosperms
- Clade: Monocots
- Order: Asparagales
- Family: Iridaceae
- Genus: Iris
- Subgenus: Iris subg. Iris
- Section: Iris sect. Iris
- Species: I. pseudopumila

Binomial name
- Iris pseudopumila Tineo (1827)

Subspecies
- Iris pseudopumila subsp. gozoensis N.Service; Iris pseudopumila subsp. pseudopumila

= Iris pseudopumila =

Species of flowering plant

Iris pseudopumila is a perennial plant species with violet, purple, or yellow flowers, sometimes in combination.The beards are white, yellow, or bluish white. It is native to southeastern Italy, Sicily, Malta, and former Yugoslavia.

Two subspecies are accepted.

- Iris pseudopumila subsp. gozoensis N.Service – Gozo
- Iris pseudopumila subsp. pseudopumila – southeastern Italy, Sicily, Malta, and former Yugoslavia
