= Iris timofejewii =

Conservation status
- Endangered (IUCN 3.1)

Scientific classification
- Kingdom: Plantae
- Clade: Tracheophytes
- Clade: Angiosperms
- Clade: Monocots
- Order: Asparagales
- Family: Iridaceae
- Genus: Iris
- Subgenus: Iris subg. Iris
- Section: Iris sect. Pogon
- Species: I. timofejewii

Binomial name
- Iris timofejewii Woronow

Synonyms
- None known

Species of plant

Iris timofejewii is a species of flowering plant in the genus Iris, and also in the subgenus Iris. It is a rhizomatous perennial, from the mountain slopes of the Caucasus and Dagestan. It has narrow, evergreen, falcate (sickle-shaped), grey-green (glaucous) leaves, and a short flowering stem just taller than the leaves. Each stem has 1–2 flowers in shades of violet, with white beards that have purple tips. It is cultivated as an ornamental plant in temperate regions.

== Description ==
Iris timofejewii is close in form to Iris scariosa, or Iris pumila. It has a slender stem or peduncle, that can grow up to between 10–25 cm (4–10 in) tall. The stem is normally taller than the foliage. The stem has two acute, carinate (keeled), spathes (leaves of the flower bud). It holds between 1, and 2 terminal (top of stem) flowers, in late spring and early summer, in June. It has evergreen, grey-green, or blue-green, or glaucous leaves. They are falcate, or recurved. The narrow leaves, can grow up to between 12–25 cm (5–10 in) long, and between 5 -6mm wide.

The flowers are very similar to aril iris species flowers. The flowers are 4–6 cm (2–2 in) in diameter, come in shades of violet, from reddish-violet, reddish brown, to blue-violet, dark violet, to purple. They are similar in form to Iris germanica, or Iris section Regalia flowers. Like other irises, it has 2 pairs of petals, 3 large sepals (outer petals), known as the 'falls' and 3 inner, smaller petals (or tepals), known as the 'standards'. The narrow, and tucked, falls are obovate. In the middle of the falls, is a row of short hairs called the 'beard', which is white, or yellow, with purple tips. The standards are oblanceolate-oblong, with round tips. It has style branches that are a similar length to the falls and a perianth tube which is 4–5 times as longer than the ovary. After the iris has flowered, in mid to late summer, it produces a seed capsule, that is similar in form to Iris pumila. The capsule is coated with a wart-like covering.

The rhizomes are small, stout and branched. They form slowly spreading clumps. The rhizomes are planted flush with the ground, and have long secondary roots that go deep into the soil to find nutrients.

=== Biochemistry ===
As most irises are diploid, (including I. timofejewii,) having two sets of chromosomes, this can be used to identify hybrids and classification of groupings. It has a chromosome count: 2n=24.

== Taxonomy ==
First found in Dagestan, Iris timofejewii was first published and described by Yury Nikolaevich Voronov in 'Not. Syst. Herb. Hort. Petrop.' vol.62, and Bot. Mater. Gerb. Glavn. Bot. Sada R.S.F.S.R. Vol.5 on page62 in 1924. It is not known who the Latin specific epithet timofejewii refers to. It was then published in Fl. Kavk. in 1928, and FL. Cauc. Vol.1 on page 257 in 1928.

In 1939, it was thought to be a form of Iris scariosa, then in 198 Brian Mathew classed it as a species related to Iris suaveolens. It was verified by United States Department of Agriculture and the Agricultural Research Service on 4 April 2003, then updated on 18 January 2006.

I. timofejewii is a tentatively accepted name by the RHS.

It is often known as Timofeev's Iris.

== Distribution and habitat ==
Iris timofejewii is native to temperate regions of Asia, specifically the Eastern Caucasus, and is endemic to Dagestan, (including the districts of Akhvakhskiy, Akhtynskiy Botlikhskiy, Gumbetovskiy, Gunibskiy, Karabudakhkentskiy, Levashinskiy, Shamilskiy, Tsumadisnkiy, and Untsukulskiy,) a republic of Russia.

They can be found at an altitude of 500–1,500 m (1,600–4,900 ft) above sea level, growing on the dry, rocky mountain, slopes, (normally made of limestone,) or scrubland steppes.

== Conservation ==
It once had a large population range in the 70s, but by 1981, that had been severely cutback until only 2–3 dozen individuals were remaining. Then it became a protected plant species, also specimens were sent to various botanical gardens for species preservation. It was then included in the Red Data Books of the RSFSR in 1988 and it is now listed in the Red Data Books of the Russian Federation (of 2008) and Dagestan (of 1998). It was listed as (V) – Vulnerable. It currently has a restricted population range in Russia, with only five spread-out locations and up to 5,000 plants. It is currently listed as (E) – Endangered.

It was threatened by overgrazing, the plant was eaten by cattle, to such extent that a large population of the iris, around the village of Tsudakhar was almost totally devastated between 10–15 years. Now, only 20–30 individuals have survived.

In the Botanical Garden of Georgia, they have produced several self seedings of the iris and other rare irises (including Iris iberica, Iris graminea, Iris imbricata, and Siphonastilis lazica, to stop them becoming extinct.

== Cultivation ==
Iris timofejewii prefers to grow in scree-like soils, in full sun, with low humidity (or in dry soils). It can be grown within garden rockeries. It needs a dry and warm summer to rest and to re-flower the next season. The species was tested for hardiness in the Russian botanical gardens of Alma-Ata, Baku, Bakuriani, Tallinn and Tbilisi. An attempt was tried to grow the iris in West Germany and the US (near New York City), but they were unsuccessful, due to high humidity conditions.

It can normally only be found for cultivation in specialised iris nurseries. Irises can generally be propagated by division, or by seed growing. Seeds can be distributed around by ants and birds, which take between 2–3 years to germinate.

Like other irises, it can be damaged by slugs and snails.

== Toxicity ==
Like many other irises, most parts of the plant are poisonous (rhizome and leaves), and if mistakenly ingested can cause stomach pains and vomiting. Handling the plant may cause skin irritation or an allergic reaction.

== Sources ==
- Czerepanov, S. K. Vascular plants of Russia and adjacent states (the former USSR). 1995 (L USSR)
- Mathew, B. The Iris. 1981 (Iris) 37.
