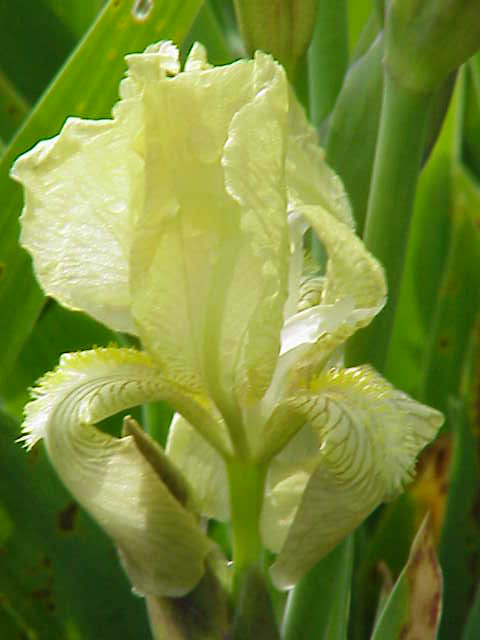

Scientific classification
- Kingdom: Plantae
- Clade: Tracheophytes
- Clade: Angiosperms
- Clade: Monocots
- Order: Asparagales
- Family: Iridaceae
- Genus: Iris
- Subgenus: Iris subg. Iris
- Section: Iris sect. Iris
- Species: I. junonia

Binomial name
- Iris junonia Heinrich Wilhelm Schott and Karl Georg Theodor Kotschy

Synonyms
- Iris purpureobractea

= Iris junonia =

Species of plant

Iris junonia is a plant species in the genus Iris and the subgenus Iris. It is a rhizomatous perennial, found in parts of Turkey. It has short, glaucous, and straight- or falcate-shaped leaves, tall stems with several branches, numerous or up to eight flowers in various colours from blue, blue-purple, lavender, pale blue, cream, white, to yellow, with brown veining and white tipped orange beards. It is cultivated as an ornamental plant in temperate regions. Its status is still unclear; it is unclear if it is a synonym of Iris germanica or a separate species.

== Description ==
Iris junonia has short, broad rhizomes and a few long secondary roots that can form clumps of plants. It has a style branch that is 3–4 cm (1–2 in) long and 1.2–1.6 cm (0–1 in) wide.

The iris has straight or slightly falcate (sickle-shaped), grey-green, glaucous, and sheathing leaves that can grow up to between 12 and 38 cm (5 and 15 in) long, and between 3 and 5 cm (1 and 2 in) wide. It is herbaceous—its leaves die in and remain dormant during the winter, before re-growing in the spring. In the Iris purpureobractea variety, the base of the leaves is purple violet. They can grow up to between 10–25 cm (4–10 in) long, and between 1.5 and 2.5 cm wide.

Iris junonia is a tall growing species, with a slender and stiff stem, or peduncle, that can grow up to between 20 and 65 cm (8 and 26 in) tall. The stem has several (normally 2–4) lateral branches, or pedicels. The lower branches are 2–6 cm (1–2 in) long and the upper branches are sessile. The stem has obtuse or rounded, inflated, spathes (leaves of the flower bud), which are green, 2–7.6 cm (1–3 in) long, and scarious above. In the Iris purpureobractea variety, the spathes are very heavily stained purple; hence, the name Iris purpureobractea. The stem (and many branches) can hold up to 7 flowers, between May and June or (rarely) July.

The flowers are chunky and 4–8 cm (2–3 in) in diameter. They come in various colours, including blue-purple, lavender, pale blue, white, cream, or yellow, The flowers of Iris purpureobractea are variable in colour and come in shades of blue or yellow. The blue ranges from purple, lavender, ice-blue, and pale blue. The yellow ranges from white, off-white, to pale yellow, straw yellow, tan, pale brown. There are occasionally blended or bi-toned flowers, such as white and purple forms. The blue forms have a darker centre patch, or are veined with purple. The yellow forms can be pale yellow with greenish-brown veining, and have bracts that are not so intensely purple stained.

Like other irises, it has 2 pairs of petals: 3 large sepals (outer petals known as the "falls") and 3 smaller tepals (inner petals known as the "standards"). The falls are obovate shaped and cuneate (wedge) shaped at the base. They are 5.2–6 cm (2–2 in) long and between 2.8–3.5 cm (1–1 in) wide. In the centre of the falls are beards, a rows of small thick hairs, which is white and tipped with yellow or orange. The standards are obovate (shaped) with a narrow claw (section of the petal closest to the stem), they are 5–6.5 cm (2–3 in) long, and between 2.5–4 cm (1–2 in) wide. The hafts (the section of petal closest to the stem) are white with brown-purple or brown veins.

After the iris has flowered, it produces an oblong seed capsule 5 cm (2 in) long and 1.5 cm (1 in) wide. Inside the capsule are seeds (called pollen) that are 121 long x 123 wide (in microns).

=== Genetics ===
In 1989, a karyological study was carried out on 4 iris species in Turkey, including Iris junonia. It found the chromosome counts of the iris species, and Iris junonia was counted as 2n = 4x = 48. It was also found that Iris purpureobractea has a complex karyology and plant morphology. As most irises are diploid, having two sets of chromosomes, this can be used to identify hybrids and classification of groupings. Iris junonia was found to be tetraploid and had a count of 2n = 48. Iris purpureobractea is a diploid, and has a count of 2n = 48. It has also been recorded as 2n = 24, 48, 49, and 72.

== Taxonomy ==
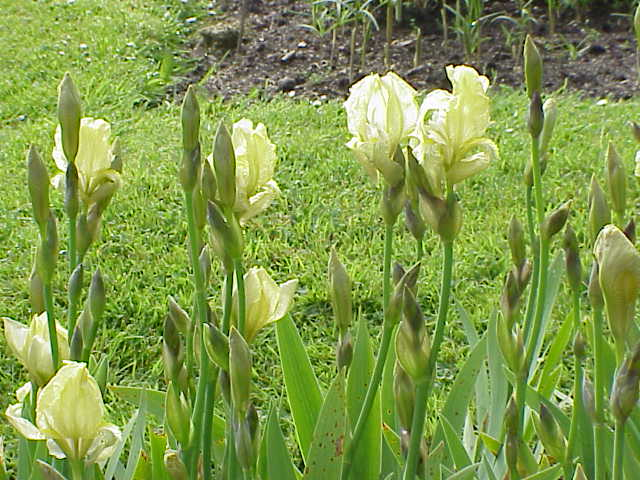

Iris junonia is also known as 'Iris junoninana' or 'Iris pallida junonia', especially in Europe. The Latin specific epithet junonia refers to the Roman goddess Juno, although it is not known exactly how the plant was named.

Specimens were found by Walter Siehe (1859–1928) of Mersina in the Turkish mountains, who sent them to Johann Nicolaus Haage and Johann Christoph Schmidt of Erfurt, in Germany. The plant was first published and described in 1864, by Heinrich Wilhelm Schott and Karl Georg Theodor Kotschy in Österreichisches Botanisches Wochenblatt (in Vienna).

The origins of Iris junonia have been frequently debated and discussed. Some believe that it could be considered a form of Iris pallida; hence, it is sometimes known as Iris pallida junonia. It could also be a small form of Iris mesopotamica. Brian Mathews (in 1981) considered Iris junonia, among seveeral other irises, to be "doubtfully wild" and probable forms of Iris × germanica. William Rickatson Dykes (1877–1925) was unsure if any true plants were still in cultivation.

Iris junonia was listed by the United States Department of Agriculture and the Agricultural Research Service as a synonym of Iris pallida Lam. on 4 April 2003; it was updated on 1 December 2004. It is also listed in the Encyclopedia of Life and the Catalogue of Life. Iris junonia is a tentatively accepted name by the Royal Horticultural Society (RHS).

=== Iris purpureobractea ===
The Latin specific epithet purpureobractea is the purple bracts of the iris. The plant was collected on Honaz Dag, by Asuman Baytop of Istanbul University, and was first published and described by Brian Mathew and Baytop in 1982. It is listed in the Encyclopedia of Life. Iris purpureobractea is a 'tentatively' accepted name by the RHS.

== Distribution and habitat ==
=== Distribution ===
Iris junonia is a rare plant, with only a few wild colonies. It is native to temperate areas of Asia minor. It is endemic to Turkey (especially in the north, northwest, west, and southwest, within the provinces of Sakararya, Usak, and Bolu). It has also been found in the Eastern Anatolia region (with Iris taochia and Iris schachtii), on Honaz Mountain in Denizli Province, in the Taurus Mountains in Cilicia, and in the Adana and Içel provinces of Turkey. It is endemic to Sicilian Taurus (a hill for which the city of Taormina was named).

=== Habitat ===
The plant grows in dry areas, on mountains (made of volcanic rock), in scrublands, on rock slopes, on cliff sides, or on plateaus, within open glades in forests. Iris junonia can be found at an altitude of 60–1,600 m (200–5,250 ft) above sea level.

== Cultivation ==
Iris junonia is hardy to close to −15 °C (5 °F). It is hardy enough to grow in France, but not fully hardy in the United Kingdom. It prefers to grow in well-drained soils containing limestone, in dry locations, and in full sun. It can be grown in rock gardens, but can be damaged by slugs and aphids. It can also be prone to rhizome rot. William Rickatson Dykes recommends a planting time of between August and September.

Irises can generally be propagated by division or seed growing. Iris junonia can be used in hybridization, used like Iris aphylla. It can be crossed with various other bearded irises, and can be crossed with other iris species (such as Iris pumila and Regelia section irises) to produce fertile offspring. Dykes believed that Iris junonia had potential in breeding programmes to create plants with tall stems and large flowers.

== Culture ==
In 2002, Mozambique released a postage stamps showing an illustration of the iris as part of a set of stamps about flora. In 2013, a study was carried out on the cultural conditions of Iris species in Turkey.

== Sources ==
- Davis, P. H., ed. 1965–1988. Flora of Turkey and the east Aegean islands.
- Huxley, A.J. 1992. The new Royal Horticultural Society dictionary of gardening. Vol. 1–4. London p.(2) 674
- Mathew, B. 1981. The Iris. 30, 26–27, 38..
