= Taochi =

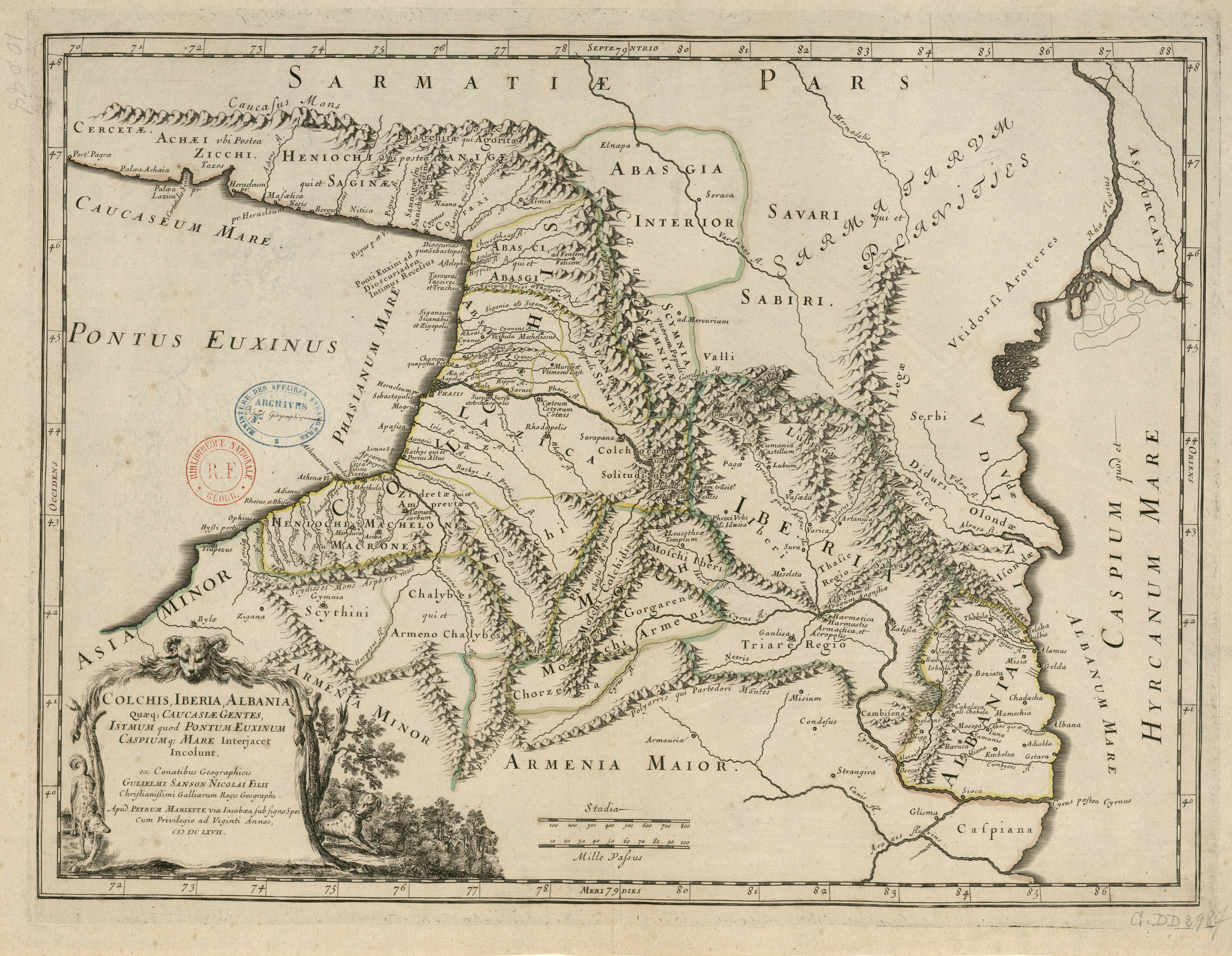
Taochi in a Colchis, Iberia, Albania etc. map by Guillaume Sanson, 1667

The Taochi, or Taochoi (Georgian: ტაოხები, Taochebi; Ancient Greek: Τάοχοι) were a people of Anatolia in antiquity, known mainly from Greco-Roman ethnography. The Taochoi lived in a mountainous area of the Black Sea to the current borders of Georgia, Armenia, and Turkey. Their country was adjacent to those of the Chalybians and Phasians.

While passing through their lands circa 400 BC, Xenophon and the Ten Thousand faced hostility from the Taochi. Xenophon recorded that these people were brave, valiant and self-sacrificing to such an extreme that after losing a battle, the Taochi, along with their wives and children, committed mass suicide by jumping off a cliff:

Then there came a dreadful spectacle: the women threw their little children down from the rocks and then threw themselves down after them, and the men did likewise. In the midst of this scene Aeneas of Stymphalus, a captain, catching sight of a man, who was wearing a fine robe, running to cast himself down, seized hold of him in order to stop him; but the man dragged Aeneas along after him, and both went flying down the cliffs and were killed. In this stronghold only a very few human beings were captured, but they secured cattle and asses in large numbers and sheep.

The iris species Iris taochia, native to Turkey, is named after the Taochi.

== See also ==
- Diauehi
- Tao-Klarjeti
