= Wilhelm Schacht =

German botanist (1903–2001)

Wilhelm Schacht (born 11 December 1903 in Munich; died 17 February 2001 in Frasdorf) was a German botanist, gardener, photographer and author. He became known for being senior staff member of Botanischer Garten München-Nymphenburg, whose open air department he took care of for 21 years.

== The gardener ==
Born in Munich as son of German art painter Wilhelm M. Schacht (1872–1951), Wilhelm Schacht started his gardening apprenticeship in 1918 in a facility in Rothenburg near Weimar. In 1920, after finishing his apprenticeship, Schacht worked as assistant in a nursery in Rastenburg. Here he met Leo Jelitto, a well known gardener and botanist. They collaborated as authors and publishers of the learned journal Freiland-Schmuckstauden. Together they also published various specialist books.

In 1927 Schacht became an inspector for park areas of Tsar Boris III of Bulgaria along the coast of the Black Sea. In 1936 Schacht became director of all royal nurseries of Bulgaria. With support of the monarch, who was interested in botany by himself, Schacht shaped and took care of the royal gardens. He worked in Bulgaria until 1944. Shortly before the end of the Second World War, Schacht returned to Germany and attended the gardens of former Tsar Ferdinand I of Bulgaria, father of Boris III, in Coburg.

== The botanist ==
In 1947 Schacht came to Botanischer Garten München-Nymphenburg. He ran the open air department for 21 years. One of his main topics was the extension and maintenance of the Alps garden at the Schachen. The "Schachengarten", as it is called, and the Alpinum in the botanical garden impressed Schacht the most. During his world travels, he discovered and collected a lot of plants, which he researched and propagated in Munich. A success has been the cultivation of Pinus uncinata, a Bergkiefernart, also known as "Spirke", with the botanical name Pinus mugo subsp. uncinata, which he brought as seedling from the Pyrenees to Munich-Nymphenburg. Wilhelm Schacht has been followed by his son Dieter Schacht in caring for the apine garden at Schachen and the Alpinum in Munich-Nymphenburg.

Schacht was close friends with Ernst von Siemens, a plant enthusiast, businessman, and son of the German industrialist Carl Friedrich von Siemens, who supported the Botanischer Garten München-Nymphenburg with the Carl Friedrich von Siemens Stiftung (Siemens Foundation), which he founded. In Schachts era 1.6 million Deutsche Marks from the Siemens Foundation were donated to the glasshouses of the botanical garden. Together with Siemens, Schacht created the "Gesellschaft der Freunde des Botanischen Gartens München" (German for "Association of friends of the botanical garden Munich"). The most well known institution created by this association was the glasshouse for alpine plants in Munich-Nymphenburg with many sensitive plants. Schacht also made friends with the painter Claus Caspari (1911–1980), who created many of his paintings of flowers, especially orchids, in context of the botanical garden Munich-Nymphenburg.

== The author and photographer ==
A long time before his retirement in 1968 Schacht discovered photography as one of his hobbies. In his countless articles on gardening and botany he often used his own pictures. His first great book of "Freiland-Schmuckstauden" has become a standard since 1950. He published it together with Leo Jelitto, later editions he supervised with Alfred Feßler. In 1953 it was followed by "Der Steingarten" (German for "The Stone Garden"), which is also a gardening standard and one of the most famous books by Wilhelm Schacht. Other of his publications include "Blumenzwiebeln für Garten und Heim" (1953), "Frühjahrsboten, Erster Blütenflor im Garten" (1971) und "Blumen Europas" (1976).

== Honors ==
Wilhelm Schacht has been honorary member of the Bayerische Botanische Gesellschaft ("Bavaria Botanical Association"), the English Alpine Garden Society, corresponding member of the Lily Society, member of the Rock Garden Society in Scotland of British Royal Horticultural Society. In 1996 Wilhelm Schacht received the Ernst von Siemens-Medaille for his Gesellschaft der Freunde des Botanischen Gartens München.

In 1957, botanist Friedrich Markgraf named Iris schachtii after him in Gartenbauwissenschaft (Gartenbauw) in Vol. 22 on page 550.

== Works (selection) ==
- Leinfelder, Johann; Schacht, Wilhelm (1970). Zimmerpflanzen leicht gepflegt. Obst- und Gartenbauverlag. ISBN 978-3-87596-055-6.
- Schacht, Wilhelm (1970). Das Blütenjahr im Garten. Obst- und Gartenbauverl. ISBN 978-3-87596-056-3.
- Schacht, Wilhelm (1971). Frühlingsboten Erster Blütenflor im Garten. Ulmer. ISBN 978-3-8001-6047-1. OCLC 721170179.
