= Phasians =

The Phasians (Georgian: ფაზიელები Pazielebi; Greek: Φασιανοί Phasianoi; Latin: Phasiani) were an ancient tribe located in the eastern part of Pontus. The Greek commander Xenophon, who encountered them during his march through Asia Minor to the Black Sea (401–400 BC), places them on the river Phasis. Here, the Phasis of Xenophon is not the common Graeco-Roman designation for the modern day Rioni River in Georgia (called Phasis in Greek), but rather the sources of Araxes in what is now northeastern Turkey. At the time when Xenophon met them, the Phasians were in control of the long valley to the north of Cilligül Dağ, and lived in the neighborhood of the Chalybes and Taochi, presumably proto-Georgian tribes.

In his classic work On Airs, Waters, and Places, the Greek physician Hippocrates described the Phasians, c. 400 BC, as having "shapes different from those of all other men; for they are large in stature, and of a very gross habit of body, so that not a joint nor vein is visible; in color they are sallow, as if affected with jaundice. Of all men they have the roughest voices, from their breathing an atmosphere which is not clear, but misty and humid; they are naturally rather languid in supporting bodily fatigue."

The name of this tribe seems to have survived in the latter-day regional toponyms – Georgian Basiani, Byzantine Phasiane, Armenian Basean, and Turkish Pasin.
