= Mount Honaz =

Mountain in Denizli, Turkey

Mount Honaz National Park
- Honaz Dağı Milli Parkı
- IUCN category II (national park)
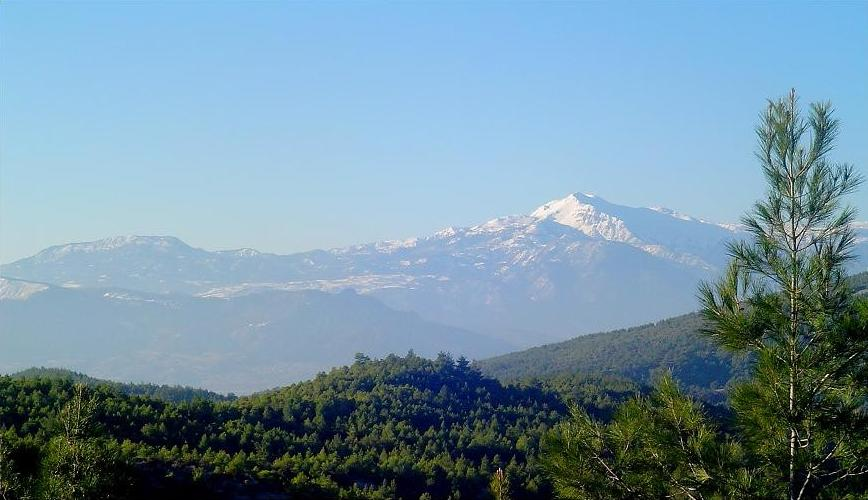

- Location within Turkey
- Location: Denizli Province, Turkey
- Nearest city: Denizli
- Coordinates: 37°45′29″N 029°16′15″E
- Established: April 21, 1995; 31 years ago
- Governing body: Directorate-General of Nature Protection and National Parks; Ministry of Environment and Forest

Mount Honaz (Turkish: Honaz Dağı), known in ancient sources as Mount Kadmos or Cadmus, is a mountain and a national park, located in southwestern Turkey, 17 km (11 mi) east of the province seat of Denizli. In the Battle of Mount Cadmus in the Middle Ages, the Seljuks defeated the French on the mountain's slopes. On April 21, 1995, it was proclaimed as a protected area. Honaz, Denizli's depending township that carries the same name as the mountain, is situated on the mountain slopes. At 2,571 m (8,435 ft), it is the highest mountain in Turkey's Aegean Region.

The mountain is covered with forests, which are particularly dense in its northern side. Ice and snow are omnipresent around its summit. There has been a project for establishing a ski resort on the mountain a few years ago when the province's marking governor, the late Recep Yazıcıoğlu was in office. However, these plans lie idle for the moment despite the suitable conditions the mountain offers for winter sports.
