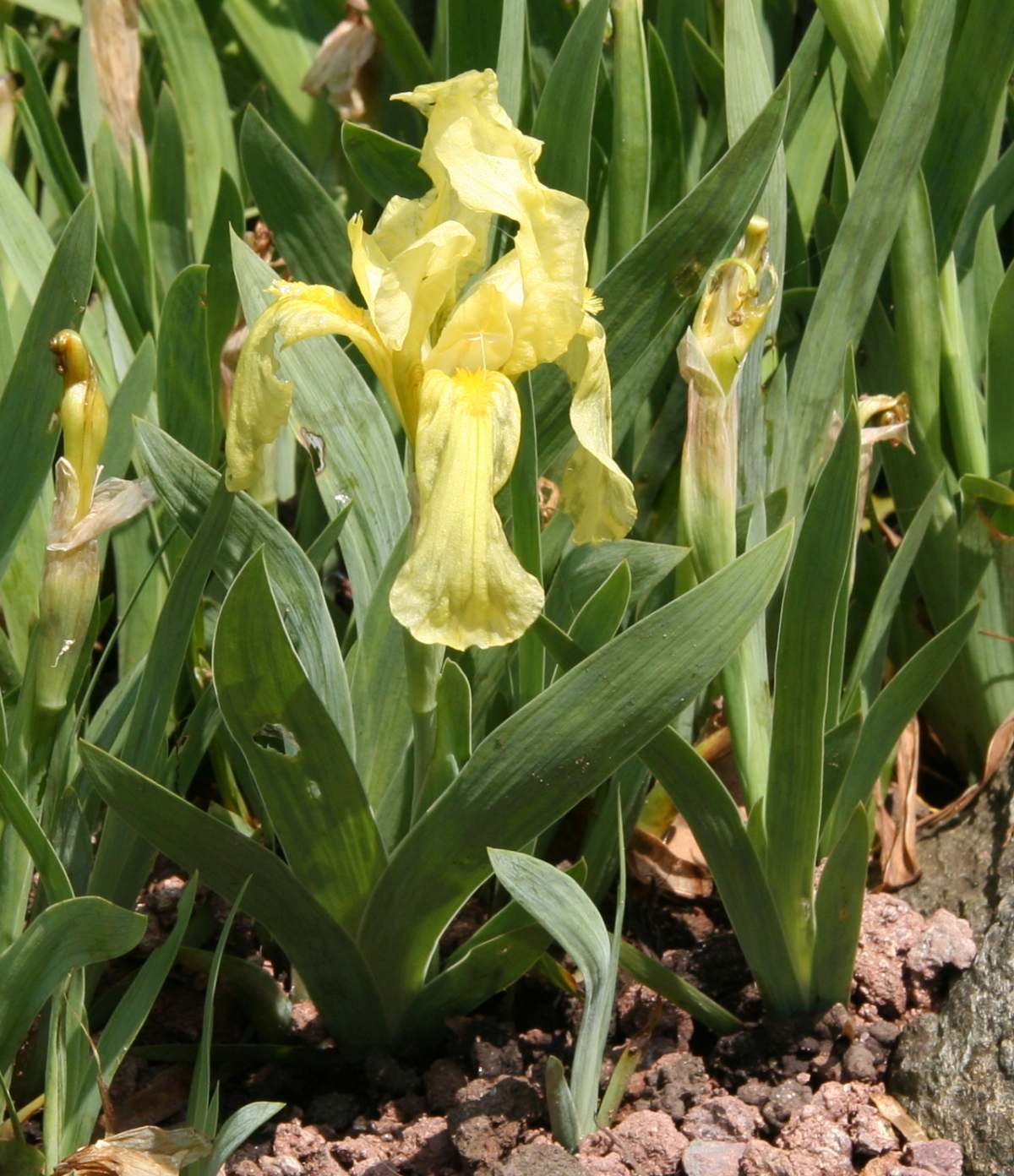

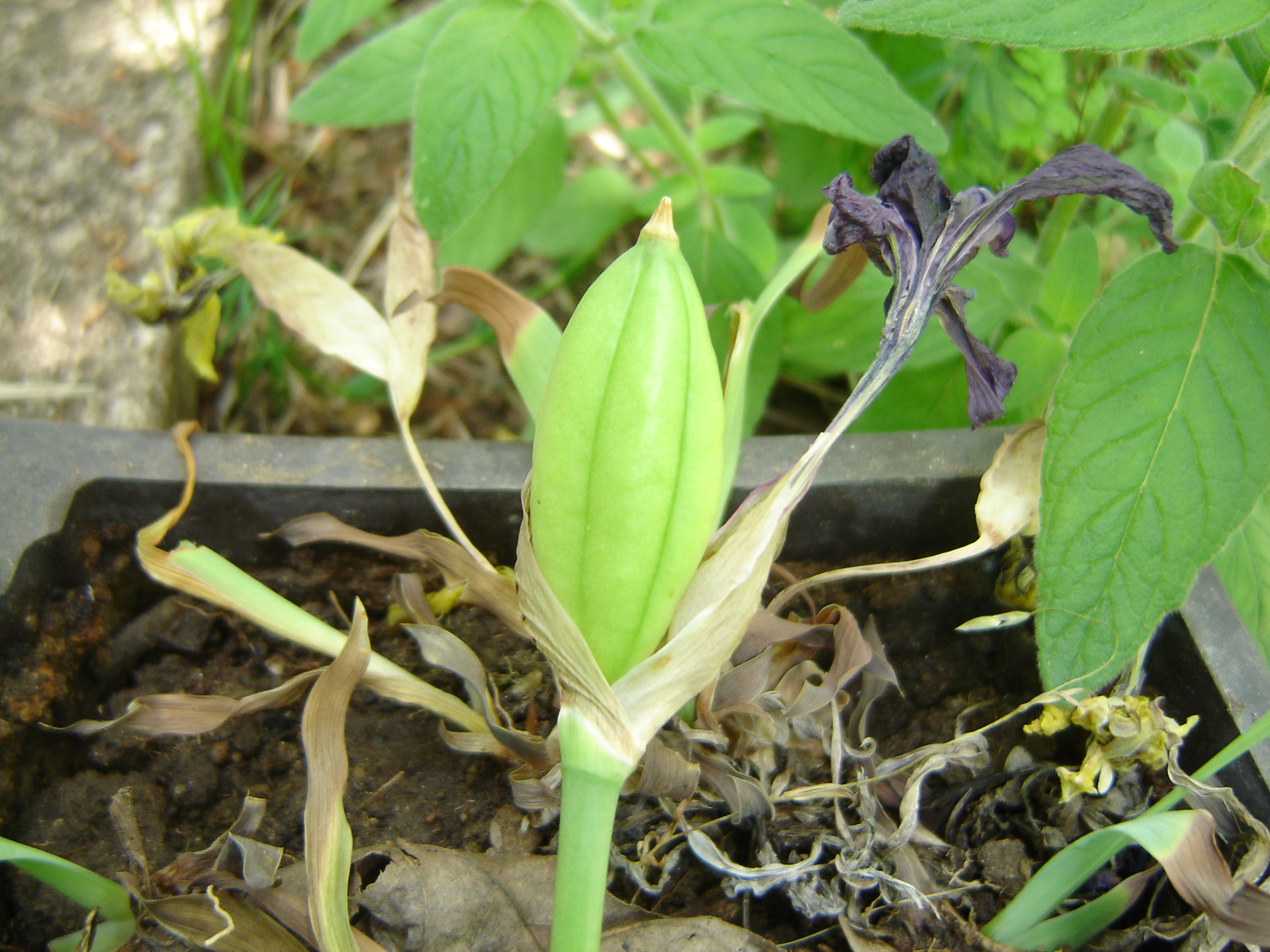
- Fruit

Scientific classification
- Kingdom: Plantae
- Clade: Tracheophytes
- Clade: Angiosperms
- Clade: Monocots
- Order: Asparagales
- Family: Iridaceae
- Genus: Iris
- Subgenus: Iris subg. Iris
- Section: Iris sect. Pogon
- Species: I. reichenbachii

Binomial name
- Iris reichenbachii Heuff.

Synonyms
- Iris athoa Foster; Iris balkana Janka; Iris bosniaca (Beck) Dörfl.; Iris livida James Booth ex Berg; Iris reichenbachii var. lutea Peia; Iris serbica Pancic; Iris skorpilii Velen.

= Iris reichenbachii =

Species of plant

Iris reichenbachii is a perennial bearded iris species native to Bulgaria, Montenegro, Serbia, North Macedonia, and into northeast Greece. Flowers are dull purple, yellow, or violet, with each stem giving one or two flowers.

It is sometimes commonly known as the 'Rock iris' in Romania.

== Habitat and distribution ==
Iris reichenbachii is a Balkan endemic species with a native distribution across Albania, Bulgaria, Greece (including Eastern Aegean islands), Serbia, North Macedonia, Bosnia and Herzegovina, Croatia, and Slovenia. The species shows considerable adaptability to various habitats and elevations throughout its range.

In Bulgaria, where it has been extensively documented, I. reichenbachii is widely distributed across multiple floristic regions. It has been recorded in diverse environments, from the Black Sea coastal areas and Danubian plains to the mountainous regions of the Balkan Range, Rhodope Mountains, and other highland areas. Particularly rich populations can be found in central and western Bulgaria. The vertical distribution of the species is extensive, ranging from lowland areas to high mountain zones, with records of plants growing at elevations up to 2900 m above sea level. This adaptability to altitude demonstrates the species' ecological adaptability.

Iris reichenbachii typically grows in open, sunny habitats with well-drained soils. It can be found in rocky areas, mountain meadows, and grasslands, often in calcareous substrates. These hardy irises have evolved to withstand the sometimes harsh conditions of their native Balkan habitats, including periods of drought and temperature extremes. The species' wide distribution in Bulgaria is confirmed by extensive herbarium collections, with nearly 300 documented specimens from various regions of the country, making it the most represented species of the subgenus Iris in Bulgarian herbaria.

== Cultivation and propagation ==
Iris reichenbachii can be propagated through conventional methods, but research has also established successful in vitro propagation protocols for conservation and commercial purposes. A 2015 study by Jevremović and colleagues demonstrated effective micropropagation techniques using both somatic embryogenesis and organogenesis from zygotic embryo cultures. The researchers isolated zygotic embryos from seeds collected in West Serbia and cultured them on Murashige and Skoog medium (MS) supplemented with 2,4-dichlorophenoxyacetic acid (2,4-D) as the sole plant growth regulator. This approach successfully induced both embryogenic and organogenic pathways simultaneously.

For somatic embryogenesis, embryogenic calli with somatic embryos were further maintained on MS medium containing 2,4-D and kinetin. Somatic embryos successfully germinated on plant growth regulator-free medium, with good germination rates. For organogenesis, green nodular calli were cultured on MS medium supplemented with different growth regulators, which induced shoot formation and proliferation. Rooting occurred when shoots were transferred to MS medium without plant growth regulators. Plants regenerated through both methods were successfully acclimatized in greenhouse conditions, with high survival rates. These plants typically flowered in the following flowering season. The study noted that while most regenerated plants maintained normal morphology, some plants derived through organogenesis showed alterations in flower structure.
