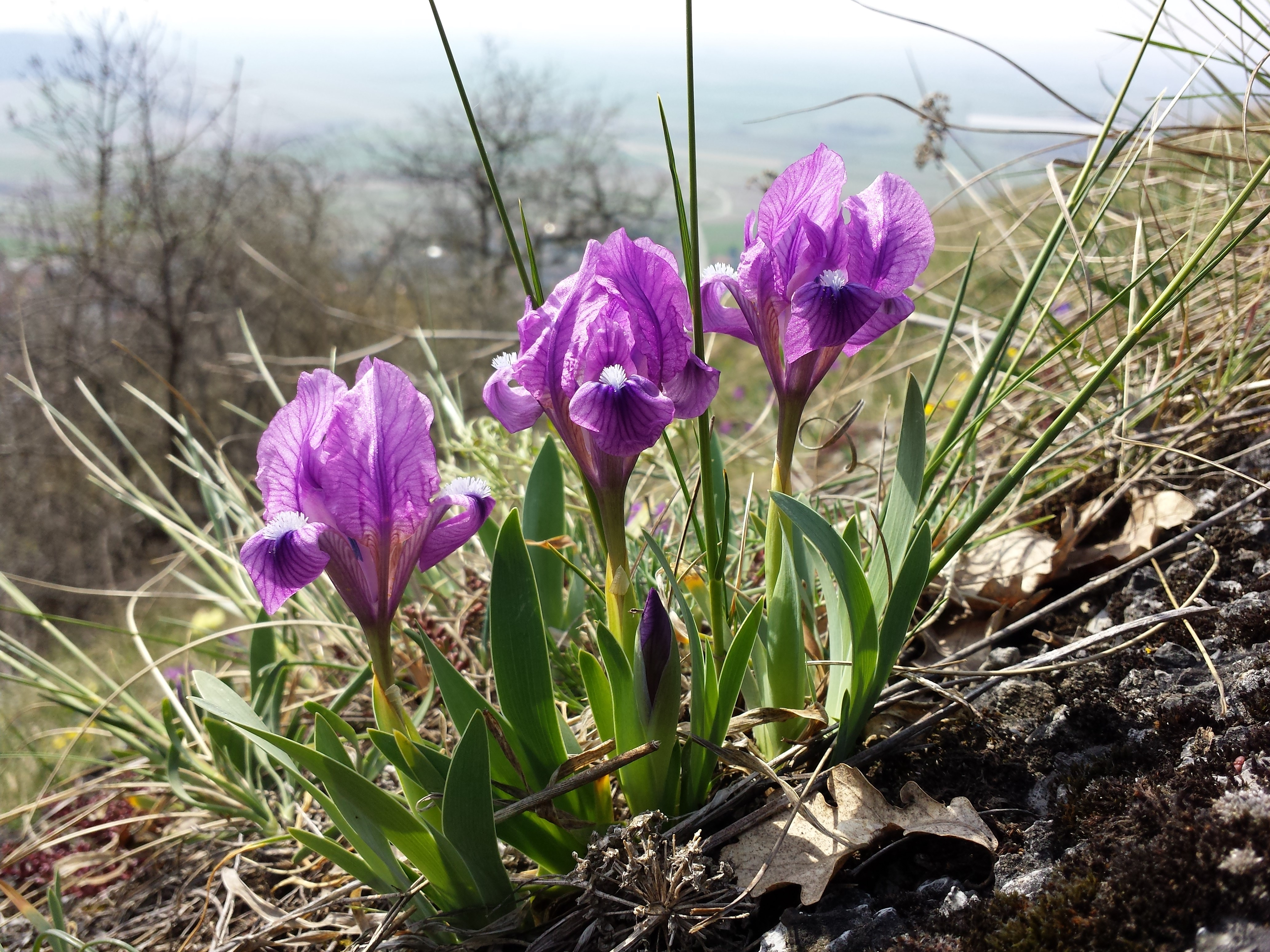

Scientific classification
- Kingdom: Plantae
- Clade: Tracheophytes
- Clade: Angiosperms
- Clade: Monocots
- Order: Asparagales
- Family: Iridaceae
- Genus: Iris
- Subgenus: Iris subg. Iris
- Section: Iris sect. Pogon
- Species: I. pumila

Binomial name
- Iris pumila L.

= Iris pumila =

Species of flowering plant

Iris pumila, sometimes known as pygmy iris or dwarf iris, probably originated as a natural hybrid between Iris pseudopumila Boissier & Heldreich and I. attica Tineo. It ranges from Austria through eastern Europe and the Balkans, in Eurasian steppe in Ukraine, southern Russia into southern Siberia and northern Kazakhstan, and the Caucasus into Turkey.

Iris pumila is distinguished by single blooms held 10–20 cm above ground level on a lengthened perianth tube, with the ovary almost resting on the rhizome on a very short stem. The flower is protected by two spathes, both of which are round in cross-section. Flower color is variable: yellow and purple or violet are the most common, but blue, cream, white, and blended colors are also frequently found. Most forms have a darker spot on the falls.

Beginning in the mid 20th century, Iris pumila was bred extensively with the hybrid tall bearded irises of gardens, giving rise to the great variety of modern dwarf and median bearded iris cultivars.

Another pumila hybrid is 'Iris coerulea' named by Édouard Spach in Hist. Veg. Phan. xiii. 50 in 1846.
