= Jesse K. Marden =

American physician (1872–1949)

Jesse Krekore Marden
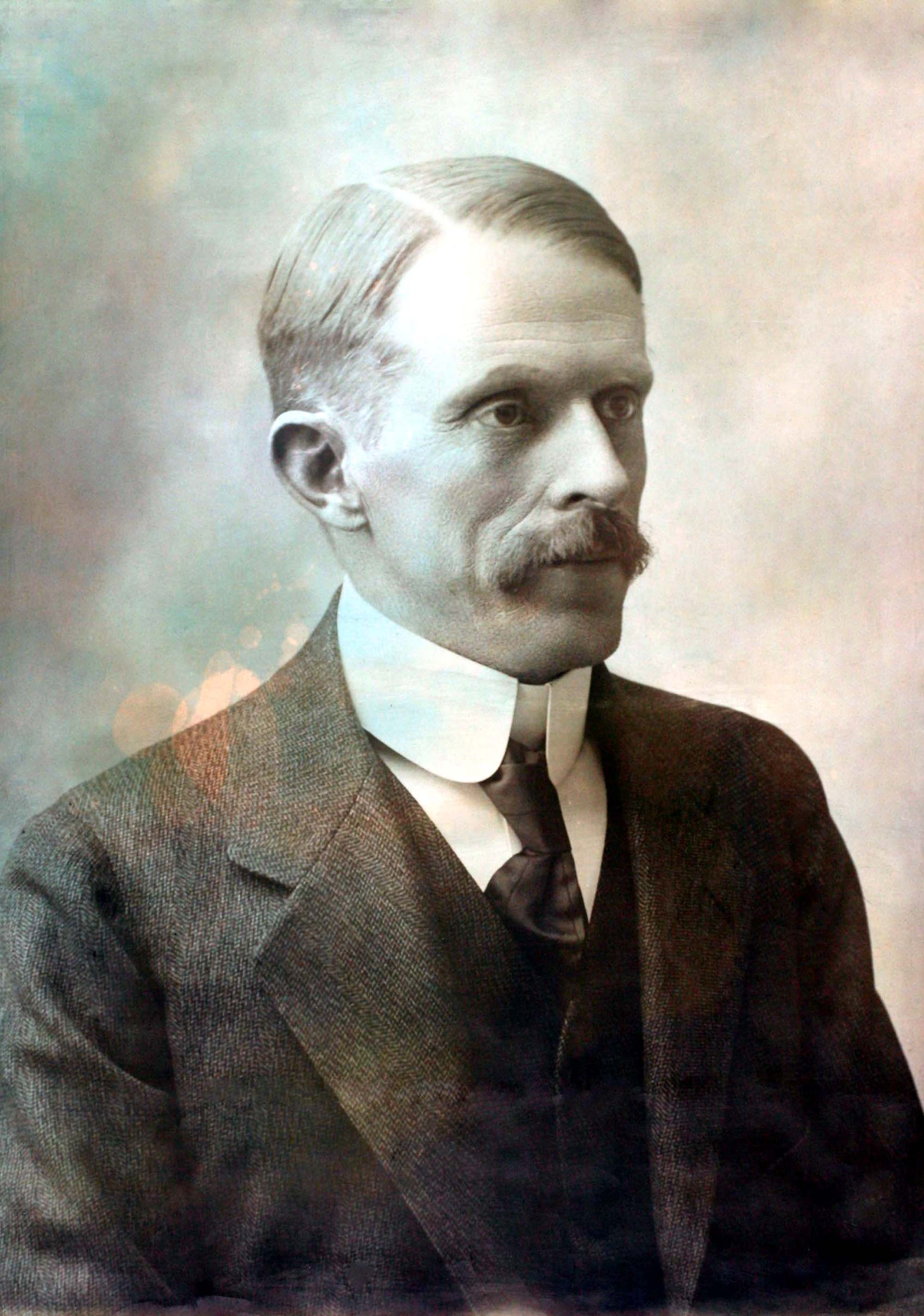
- Born: March 10, 1872; Gaziantep, Turkey
- Died: March 21, 1949 (aged 77); Claremont, California
- Education: Dartmouth College, B.A. (1895); University of Michigan Medical School, M.D. (1898)
- Occupations: Physician, relief worker, hospital director
- Years active: 1898–1941
- Organizations: Anatolia College in Merzifon; Near East Relief
- Known for: Relief work during the Armenian Genocide
- Relatives: Bertha B. Morley (sister-in-law), John D. Nutting (brother-in-law)
- Awards: Honorary Doctorate, Dartmouth College 1930

Jesse Krekore Marden (10 March 1872 — 21 March 1949) was an American physician and hospital administrator who was a leader of medical relief efforts during the Armenian Genocide through his work for Near East Relief.

== Early life ==
Marden was born on March 10, 1872, in Gaziantep, Turkey to Rev. Henry Marden and Mary Letitia Christy. Rev. Marden was a professor at the Theological Seminary at Marash; both Mardens also worked as missionaries in Turkey with the American Board of Commissioners for Foreign Missions. Both of his parents died of disease in the field; his mother died 1874, when Jesse was two years old, and his father died in 1890. Marden graduated Phi Beta Kappa with a B.A. from Dartmouth College in 1895, and with an M.D. from the University of Michigan Medical School in 1898. During his time at the University of Michigan he was president of the Students' Christian Association, and also participated in fieldwork doing outreach and research in impoverished neighborhoods in Chicago.

== Work in Turkey ==
Shortly after graduating with his M.D. in 1898, Marden was employed by the American Board of Commissioners for Foreign Missions and was sent to Gaziantep, Turkey to practice medicine. From there, he practiced medicine in Gaziantep, Adana, and Merzifon, Turkey before he was recruited by the American Board of Commissioners for Foreign Missions in 1905 to lead the hospital at Anatolia College in Merzifon. Under his leadership and fundraising efforts, the hospital's capacity expanded greatly, with renovated and new buildings, electrification, and modern medical equipment.

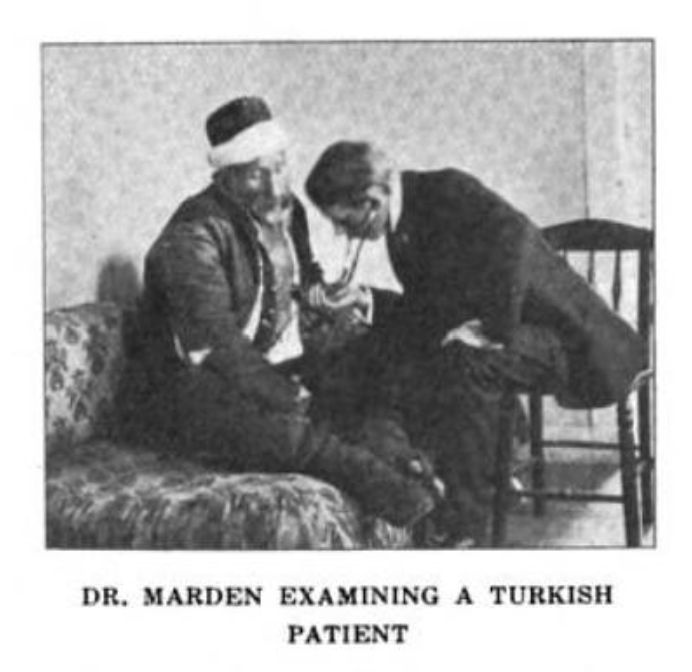
Dr. Marden Examining a Turkish Patient in 1915

Under Dr. Marden's dynamic leadership, the hospital expanded to become the medical center for north-central Asia Minor, one of nine under missionary auspices in Turkey, treating thousands of patients every year. Its expansion was accomplished with the leanest resources [...] Dr. Marden led the fundraising efforts and, with his wife, the former Lucy Morley, contributed significantly from personal resources.

— William McGrew, Educating Across Cultures: Anatolia College in Turkey and Greece, p. 96

=== During the Armenian Genocide ===
In September 1915, Marden reported on the atrocities against the Armenian people to the American Committee on Armenian Atrocities. The following year, Ottoman authorities arrested, tortured, and murdered approximately 20,000 Armenians in Marsovan. Anatolia College was attacked, several students and faculty members were arrested and executed, and the college closed. Dr. Marden witnessed these atrocities and left for the United States when the hospital was forcibly closed.

=== Expedition to Palestine ===
During World War I, in 1917 Arab rebels and their British allies captured Palestine at the conclusion of the Sinai and Palestine campaign. Consequently, in 1918 the Red Cross mounted a relief expedition to Palestine. Marden was recruited as a Chief Surgeon with the rank of Captain for the expedition. His wife, Lucy H. M. Marden, went as a member of enlisted personnel.

=== Leadership of Near East Relief ===
Marden returned to Merzifon in 1919, but was expelled again with the rest of the Americans in 1921. In 1922, he was appointed Director General of Near East Relief for American Relief Activities in Armenia and Transcaucasian Russia after directing the fight against outbreaks of cholera and typhus among victims of a famine. He worked as director from 1921 until his retirement in 1941.

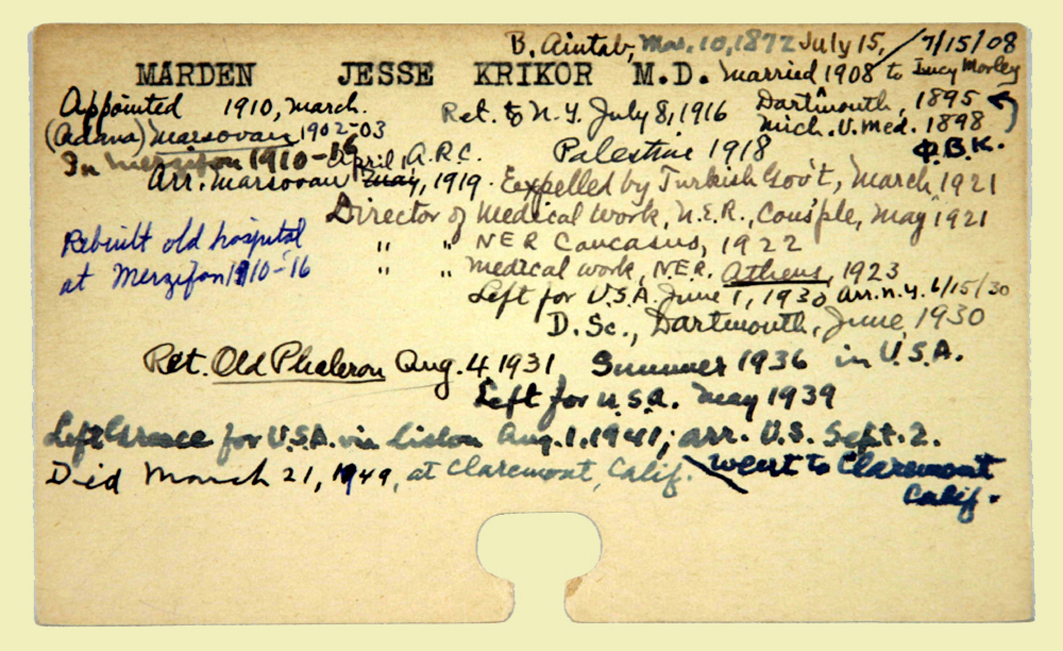
Personnel Records for Jesse K. Marden for the American Board of Commissioners for Foreign Missions

== Personal life ==
On July 15, 1908, Marden married Lucy H. Morley, an American who was working as an educator and missionary in Marsovan, Turkey. In 1912, they had a son, William Morley Marden, who died when he was 3, in 1916.

== Honors ==
In 1930, Marden was awarded an honorary Doctorate of Science from Dartmouth College in recognition of his efforts in Turkey.

== Later life ==
In 1941, due to the German invasion of Greece in World War II, Marden returned to the United States with his wife, and retired to Claremont, California where he died on March 21, 1949.

== See also ==
- George E. White (missionary)
- Witnesses and testimonies of the Armenian genocide
- Bertha B. Morley
