= Bertha B. Morley =

Educator and witness to the Armenian Genocide

Bertha Belle Morley
- Born: June 21, 1878; Mentor, Ohio, U.S.
- Died: March 22, 1973 (aged 94)
- Burial place: Claremont, California
- Education: Oberlin College; Lake Erie Conservatory of Music; New England Conservatory of Music
- Occupations: Music teacher, missionary, relief worker, principal
- Known for: Chronicling the Armenian genocide
- Relatives: John D. Nutting (brother-in-law)

Ecclesiastical career
- Religion: Congregationalist
- Writings: Marsovan 1915: The Diaries of Bertha Morley

Bertha B. Morley (June 21, 1878 – March 22, 1973) was an American educator and relief worker who headed schools and orphanages in Ottoman Turkey and Palestine, and rescued several hundred children from the Armenian genocide. Her journals of the early phase of the Armenian genocide are an important eyewitness account of the genocide.

== Early life ==
Bertha Belle Morley was born on June 21, 1878, in Mentor, Ohio, to Thomas Milton Morley, farmer and former Lieutenant in the 25th Ohio Independent Light Artillery Battery, and Lucy Mary Martindale, who taught during the Civil War for the American Missionary Association at the Grand Contaband Camp at Fort Monroe, Virginia. Her health was precarious in adolescence, with near-fatal bouts of pneumonia and brucellosis. Bertha attended Oberlin College from 1895 to 1898, but did not complete her studies due to poor health. From 1898 to 1900, she attended Lake Erie Conservatory of Music, and in 1904 she joined the New England Conservatory of Music.

Her first teaching job was under the appointment of the American Missionary Association boarding school in Pleasant Hill, Tennessee, from 1905 to 1910.

== Work in Ottoman Turkey ==
In 1911, she traveled to Merzifon, Turkey to visit her sister, Lucy Harriet Morley Marden, and her brother in law Jesse Krekore Marden, who under the direction of the American Board of Commissioners for Foreign Missions, headed the American missionary hospital in Merzifon.

Bertha became interested in the work of the mission there, and taught at the American school in Gedik Pasa, Constantinople, from 1911 to 1913.

=== Witnessing the Armenian Genocide ===
From 1913 to 1916, she joined the American Board of Commissioners for Foreign Missions Western Turkey Mission at Merzifon, at the Anatolia College in Merzifon. There, she taught music, geometry, and history at the Anatolia Girls' School in Merzifon. It was during this period that she witnessed the initial phase of the Armenian Genocide, and kept a daily journal of what she saw.

In her diary, Morley describes the escalation of the genocide as she saw it in Merzifon over the course of 1915. She describes the destruction of the Marsovan Armenian community; the arrest of Armenian intellectuals; and the methodical deportations and eventual destruction of deportees. Morley narrates how Armenian property was plundered by Ottoman local and central officials and how Armenian women and children were forced to convert and be absorbed into Muslim households. She also testifies to the efforts of Ottoman authorities to conceal their criminal activities.

== Return to the United States ==
In 1916, the Merzifon missionary institutions were suddenly closed by the Ottoman government. As a result, Morley was forced to return to the United States. Upon her return, she took refresher courses from the Hartford Seminary Kennedy School of Missions, and afterwards, from 1916 to 1917, attended the Oberlin Conservatory of Music.

== Work in Lebanon ==
From 1918 to 1919, Morley went with the American Red Cross to do refugee work. For nine months of that years she was assigned to Aintoura (then Syria, now Lebanon). In Aintoura, she worked as the principal of an orphanage of 630 children, most of whom were Armenian. There, she adopted eleven Armenian children.

== Return to Turkey ==
After the Ottoman surrender in World War I, the Marzifon mission institutions were reopened. Morley and her children returned, and Morley became head of the Anatolia Girls' School. However, in March 1921, the Turkish government again forcibly closed Anatolia College; several of its Greek teachers and students were put on show trials and executed.

=== Smyrna ===
Morley moved with her children to Smyrna where she intended to teach. However, she was present in the city for the Burning of Smyrna in September 1922 at the end of the Greco-Turkish War, and witnessed the atrocities committed against the Greeks and Armenians there. She relayed what she saw in letters. Morley rescued a large number of children from the orphanage for Armenian Girls at the American Collegiate Institute in Smyrna. She led the children to escape in an American merchant ship. They were evacuated to Piraeus, near Athens.

=== Return to Merzifon and America ===
Morley taught at the American Girls' School in Thessaloniki for two years in until June 1923. When the Marzifon Girls' School reopened in 1924, Morley returned there for a year. However she returned to the United States due to poor health in January, 1925. While there, she enrolled several of her children in American schools, and completed a B.A. from Lake Erie College in 1929.

== Principal at Anatolia College in Thessaloniki ==
Anatolia College reopened in Thessaloniki, Greece in 1924. In 1929, Morley returned to Anatolia College, and took up a position as principal of the Girls' School. She served as principal of the Girls' School until the invasion of Greece by Germany in World War II, at which point she returned to the United States.

== Later life ==
Bertha Morley returned to Ohio in 1941. In 1945 she was granted the status of Missionary Emeritus by the American Board of Commissioners for Foreign Missions. She moved to California in 1949 to help care for her ailing sister Lucy Mary Morley Marden.

Bertha Morley died March 22, 1973, in Claremont, California.

== See also ==
- George E. White (missionary)
- Witnesses and testimonies of the Armenian genocide
