= George E. White =

George E. White may refer to:

- George E. White (politician) (1848–1935), U.S. Congressman from Illinois
- George E. White (missionary) (1861–1946), Christian missionary and witness to the Armenian Genocide
