= John Nutting =

John Nutting may refer to:

- John Nutting (radio presenter), Australian radio presenter
- John Nutting (politician), member of the Maine Senate
- John Nutting (loyalist), loyalist throughout the American Revolution
- John D. Nutting, Congregationalist minister and founder of the Utah Gospel Mission
