= George Edward White =

George Edward White may refer to:

- George White (Australian politician) (1905–1986), member of the Victorian Legislative Assembly
- George E. White (missionary) (1861–1946), American Congregationalist missionary
