= Anatolia College =

Private educational institution in Thessaloniki, Greece

Coordinates: 40.598°N 23.002°E

- Αμερικανικό Κολλέγιο Ανατόλια

Location
- 60 John Kennedy Avenue, 555 35 Pylea, Thessaloniki, Greece

Information
- School type: Mixed, private, selective, non profit
- Founded: 1886 (140 years ago) in Merzifon, Ottoman Empire
- Founder: Charles Tracy
- Status: Open
- School board: Board of Trustees; Based in Boston, MA
- President: Panos Vlachos
- Faculty: 320
- Age range: 5-30
- Enrollment: 2,500
- Language: Greek and English
- Campus: Anatolia American University - ULE; Anatolia High School (A & B Gymnasium and A & B Lykeion); IBDP; Anatolia Elementary School; ACT; Pinewood American International School; CTY Greece
- Campus size: 54 acres (22 ha)
- Campus type: Suburban
- Colors: Blue and white
- Song: Morning Cometh
- Publication: The Anatolian; Alumnus others published by students
- Yearbook: Anatolian
- Website: anatolia.edu.gr
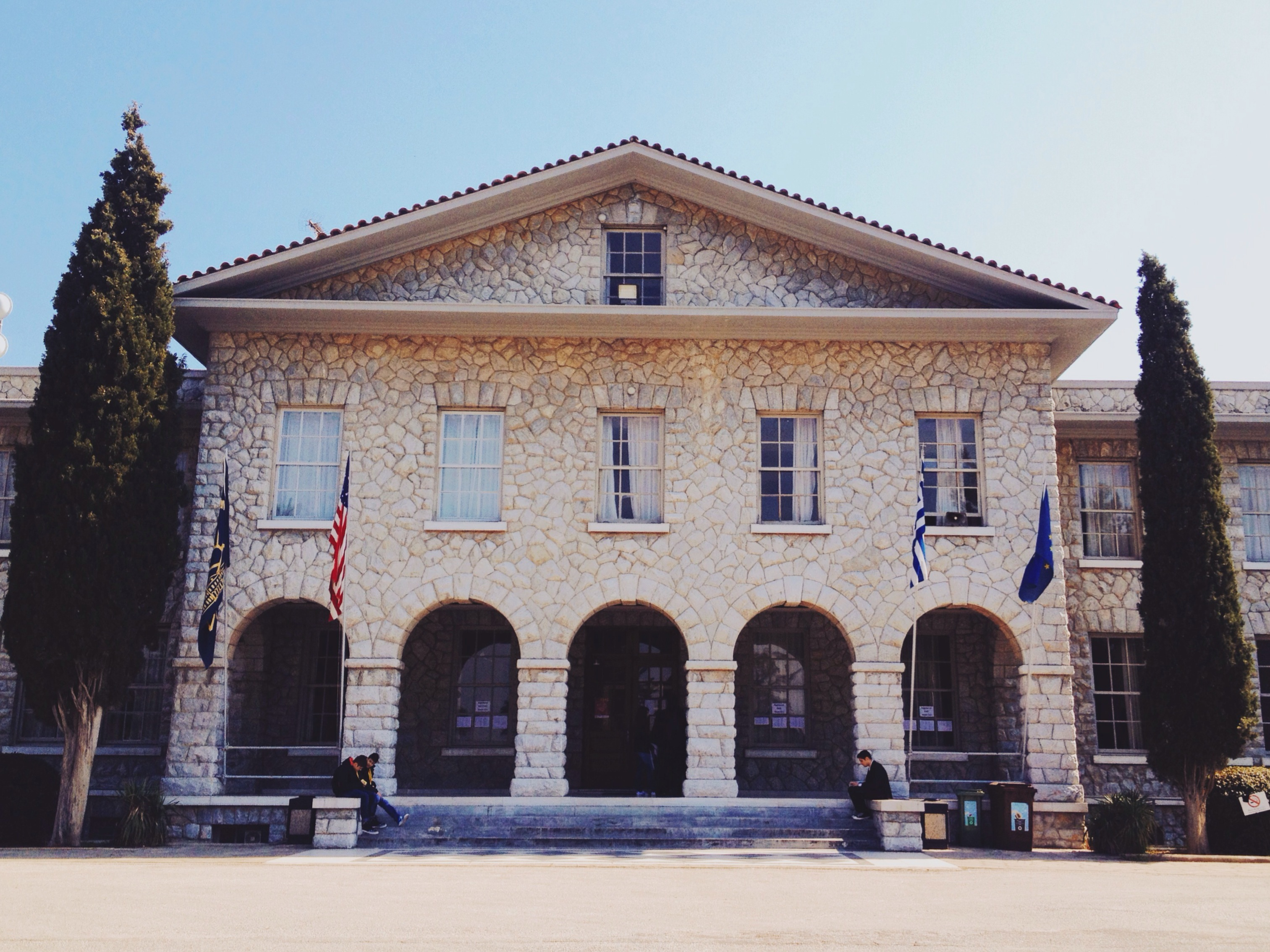
- Macedonia Hall, the main classroom building of the High School department.

Anatolia College (Greek: Κολλέγιο Ανατόλια, pronounced [koˈleʝio anaˈtolia]), also known as the American College (Greek: Αμερικάνικο Κολλέγιο, pronounced [ameriˈkaniko koˈleʝio]), is a private, non-profit, educational institution located in Pylaia, a suburb of Thessaloniki, Greece. The school has five subdivisions: Anatolia Elementary School, Anatolia High School (which includes an International Baccalaureate Diploma Program, IBDP), Pinewood International School, CTY Greece (Center for Talented Youth) and ACT (the American College of Thessaloniki), the tertiary division of the institution.

As of 2021, it is the only school in Greece with a full boarding program

== History ==
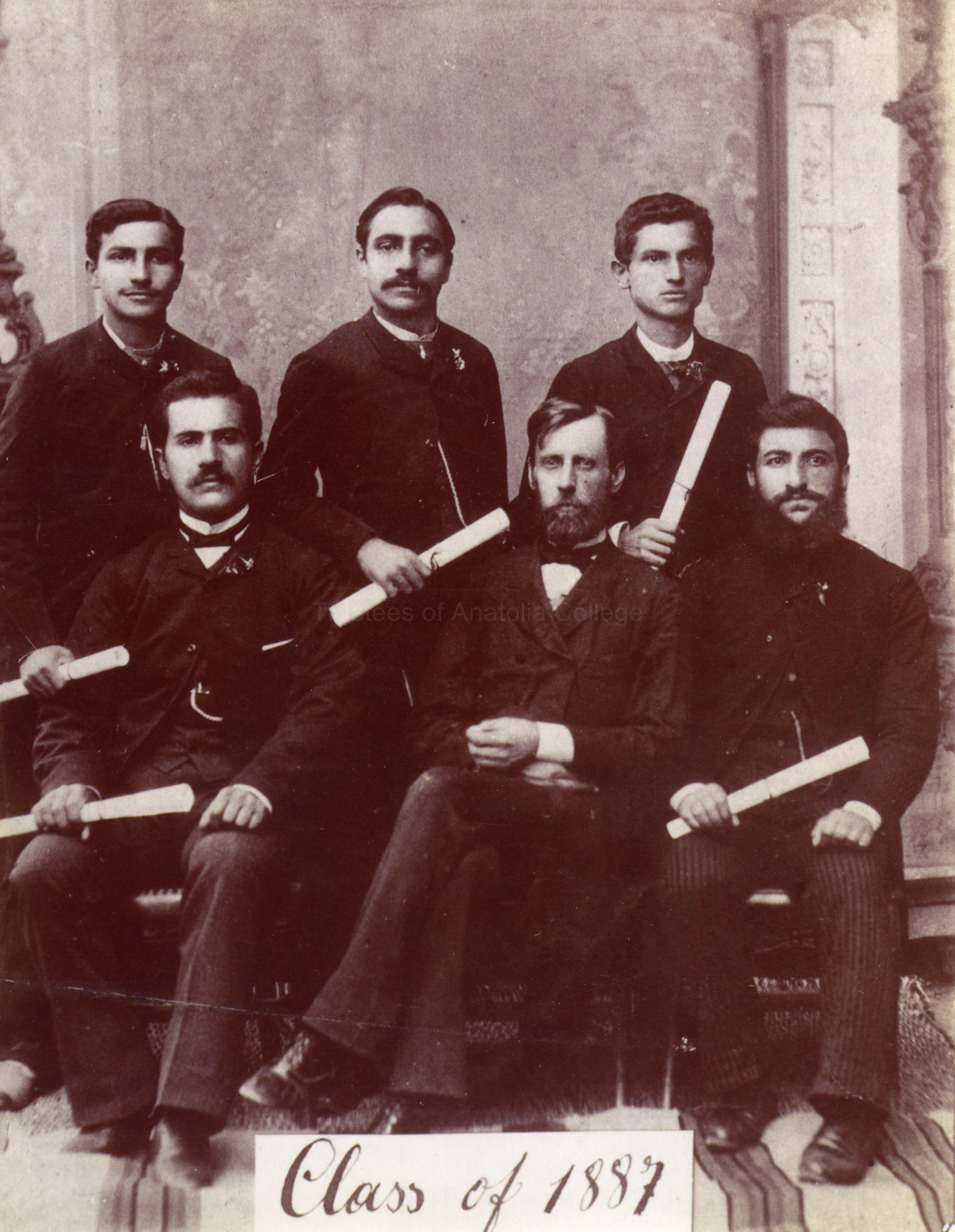
The first graduating class of Anatolia College, in 1887

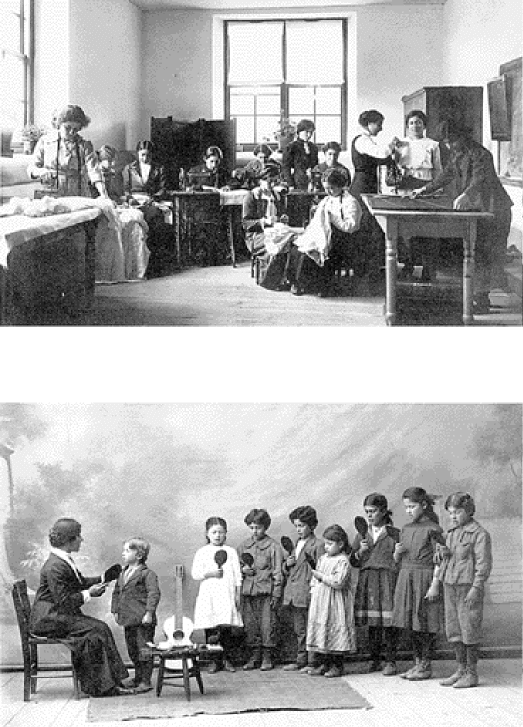
Anatolia College's campus in Merzifon included a school for girls (top) and the only school for deaf children in the Ottoman Empire (bottom)

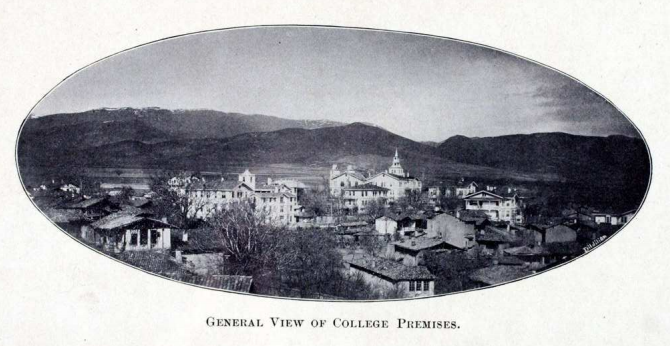
Overview of the college in 1902, when it was still located in Merzifon

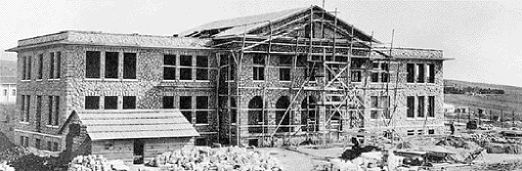
Macedonia Hall under construction in 1934

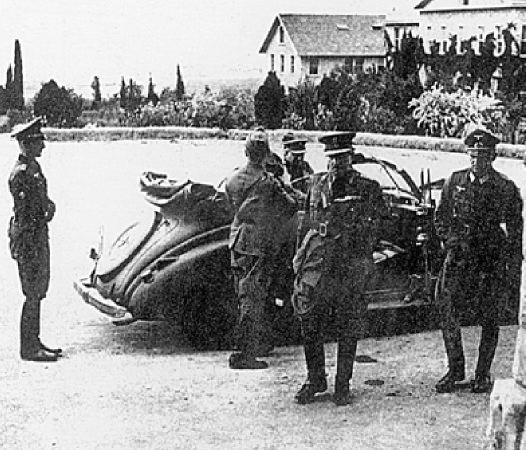
Wehrmacht officers in front of Macedonia Hall on April 9, 1941, with Stevens and Compton halls in the background

In 1810, the American Board of Commissioners for Foreign Missions was founded in Boston and established the Bebek Seminary outside Constantinople (now Istanbul) in 1840. In 1862, it was transferred to Merzifon, and in 1886, the Anatolia College of Mersovan was founded as a theological seminary for adults, with Charles Tracy as president. The students were principally Greek and Armenian, most coming from outside of Merzifon and boarding at the school, while the faculty was Greek, Armenian, and American. Enrollment soon reached 115 students. In 1893, the girls' school was founded.

In 1920, enrollment stood at 218 students, with an equal number in the girls' school and the campus consisted of more than 40 New England style buildings. Anatolia included a kindergarten, a school for the deaf, high schools for boys and girls, a college-level program, a theological seminary, one of the largest hospitals in Asia Minor, and an orphanage for 2000 orphans. The college in Merzifon was closed by Turkish nationalists after the Armenian genocide and Greek genocide caused the death of most students and teachers. The last survivors escaped to Greece in the 1923 Population exchange.

With help from Eleftherios Venizelos, Anatolia reopened in Thessaloniki in 1924, renting buildings in Harilaou, with 13 students, mostly refugees. Enrollment soon reached 157, while the Mission School for Girls in Thessaloniki became part of Anatolia College Anatolia in 1927. In 1934 the school moved to the newly constructed campus above the city near the village of Pylaia, on the lower slopes of Mt. Hortiatis.

When Greece entered World War II upon the Italian invasion in 1940, the school closed and the campus was used as military hospital. When Germany invaded Greece the campus was taken over by the Germans as general headquarters for the Balkans. The surrender documentations of Greece were signed in the school's main building, Macedonia Hall. In 1944–45 the campus was occupied by the British Army (the last units would not leave until 1949).

At the end of the war Anatolia reopened, as repair of the damaged campus proceeded. The girls' school was moved into temporary quarters on the Anatolia campus after its building on Allatini Street burned. For a number of years the schools remained separate, but co-education was completed by the end of the 1980s. However, the two schools are still administrated by different Deans. The I.B. school, was established in 1998. A school for management assistants was established in 1964 and closed early in the 21st century.

In 1981, Anatolia re-established post-secondary education (its original mission) with the founding of the School of Business Administration and Liberal Arts (SBALA), later renamed American College of Thessaloniki (ACT).

== Divisions ==
=== Anatolia Elementary School (Elementary School) ===
Anatolia Elementary School was established in 2004 and formally opened in 2005, and includes a kindergarten and an elementary school. The enrollment is 450 students (PreK-6).

=== Anatolia High School (Secondary School) ===
The secondary division of Anatolia is the original element of this educational institution. Anatolia is organized in accordance with Greek law and grants the Greek Apolytirio (the Greek high school diploma) by meeting the requirements established by the Greek Ministry of Education, while students enrolled in the IBDP program receive the IB Diploma. Entrance to the regular high school and IBDP program is based on entrance examinations administered by the school and previous grade records.

Scholarships are offered to students that don't have the means to pay the tuition fees and who have had excellent academic performance the previous years, covering anywhere from 10% to 100% of the tuition costs at the school. Special scholarships are also awarded for residents of specific prefectures or students with capabilities in the Arts.

Anatolia High School offers the MYP program from 7th to 10th grade. Student participation in the MYP is mandatory, and successful students are awarded the MYP Certificate at the end of the 10th grade, alongside the official grades from the Greek state.

With the exception of the English course, the Greek high school curriculum is taught in Greek, while all IBDP courses are taught in English except for Greek Literature, which is taught in Greek in accordance with regulations by the Greek government. Each Gymnasium (grades 7–9) and Lyceum (grades 10–12) has its own Dean and Deputy Dean, and the IBDP program has its own Director. The High School as a whole is overseen by the Vice President for Secondary Education.

==== IBDP (International Baccalaureate Diploma Programme) ====
Anatolia College's high school, apart from the Greek Ministry of Education Program, hosts the International Baccalaureate Diploma Program (IBDP) for the two final years of high school. Entrance is competitive, and upon entrance, students have to select a subject from each of the six fields of study the IB offers. The school offers almost every subject recognized by the IBDP, and allows for foreign students to pick their own native languages to study, instead of Modern Greek or English.

Students who wish for their IB Diploma to be considered equivalent to the respective Greek Apolytirio must separately attend courses in Modern Greek Language and in Greek History. The school considers the IB courses of Modern Greek Language and Modern Greek Language & Literature as equivalent to the ones taught in public schools, whereas students are regularly examined in Greek History for the duration of their studies, and after the conclusion of the final IBDP exams.

=== Anatolia American University ===
Anatolia American University - U.L.E. (Anatolia University) is the tertiary division of Anatolia.

It offers English-taught undergraduate programs in partnership with The Open University, UK. It is also accredited in the US by the New England Commission of Higher Education (NECHE).

The undergraduate programs at Anatolia American University - ULE are fully recognized by the Greek state as equivalent and corresponding to those of Greek public universities.

Bachelor's degrees available at Anatolia University:

BS in Biological Sciences BS in Business Administration (with 4 concentrations) BS in Business Computing BS in Computer Science BA in English (with 2 concentrations) BA in Political Science & International Relations BS in Psychology

Anatolia University awards a significant number of scholarships each year, thanks to an extensive need and merit-based financial aid program.

=== ACT – American College of Thessaloniki ===
ACT is the college division of the institution, accredited in the United States by the New England Commission of Higher Education (NECHE), offering programs in a variety of fields, also validated in Europe.

=== Pinewood American International School ===
The Pinewood division of Anatolia has operated since 1950, catered primarily to foreign students. Complete primary and secondary education is offered (Pre-K through grade 12) in a fully English-speaking environment. The facilities of the school were fully relocated to the main High School campus in 2024. Pinewood offers a separate PYP and MYP program, while the IBDP program is run jointly by the High School and Pinewood. A large variety of AP classes are also run, available for the older students.

=== CTY Greece ===
Anatolia College, Johns Hopkins University and the Stavros Niarchos Foundation have partnered to create the "Center for Talented Youth Greece at Anatolia College", a part of Johns Hopkins' CTY program already active internationally for over 40 years.

The goal of the program is to identify and educate children of 5 to 16 years old that have special talents or capabilities, achieve high scores in school and are dedicated to learning beyond the limits of the regular educational system.

The program began in 2014 with the setting in operation a summer camp for children of 12 to 15, who will study subjects at a university level in various fields, such as, but not limited to, game theory, forensic science, and literary analysis. The Stavros Niarchos Foundation will fund the participation of students in the program for the first 3 years of its operation.

There are additional lessons offered during the winter period and online for the entirety of the year as well.

== Notable alumni ==
- Yiannis Boutaris (class of 1960), Mayor of Thessaloniki (2011–2019).
- Raphael Demos (class of 1910, Bachelor A.B.), Professor of philosophy at Harvard University.
- Gikas Hardouvelis (class of 1973), Minister of Finance (2014–2015).
- Harris Mylonas (class of 1996), Associate Professor of Political Science at George Washington University and editor-in-chief of Nationalities Papers.
- Vasilis Tsivilikas (class of 1961), was a Greek comedy actor with significant appearances in the Greek film industry, television and especially theater.
- Amedeo Odoni (class of 1961), Professor of Aeronautics and Astronautics, Professor of Civil and Environmental Engineering at MIT.
- Auguste Corteau (class of 1996), pen name of Petros Hadjopoulos, famous Greek author.
- Alecos Papadatos (class of 1977), is a comic book writer and illustrator, best known as the artist of Logicomix, a graphic novel written by Apostolos Doxiadis and Christos Papadimitriou. Logicomix was the No. 1 New York Times Best Seller Paperback Graphic Book of October 18, 2009.
- Irene Georgakoudi, PhD (class of 1989), Professor of Biomedical Engineering, Thayer School of Engineering, Dartmouth College.

== Faculty ==
There are 230 faculty members at Anatolia College, divided among the three divisions as follows: Elementary School (32), High School (156), and ACT (42). The majority of the faculty members are Greek, plus British, American, dual nationals and other European nationalities. The student to teacher ratio is 1:9 throughout the entire institution. The administration of the school is Greek, with some members having dual citizenship.

== Governance ==
Anatolia College is governed by a board of trustees with headquarters in Boston, Massachusetts. Approximately half of the trustees reside in the New England region while most of the remainder represent other areas of the United States. Several Trustees are Greek residing in Greece. The trustees maintain an office in Boston to conduct fund-raising and otherwise serve the college.

=== Presidents ===
Anatolia has had 12 presidents. The current president is Dr. Panos Vlachos, who is the first Greek president in the history of the institution. The longest-lasting president of Anatolia was Charles Tracy, whose tenure lasted for 26 years, followed closely by Dr. William McGrew, who was president for 25 years. The shortest presidency was that of Joseph Kennedy, who was president for 3 years.

No.	President	Tenure	Nationality	School locations named after
1	Charles Tracy	1886 – 1890 & 1893 – 1914	United States	Tracy Hall
2	George Herrick	1890 – 1893	United States
3	Dr. George White	1914 – 1933	United States	White Hall
4	Ernest Riggs	1933 – 1950	United States	Riggs Hall
5	Dr. Carl Compton	1950 – 1958	United States	Compton Hall
6	Dr. Howard Johnston	1958 – 1964	United States
7	Robert Hayden	1964 – 1972	United States
8	Joseph Kennedy	1972 – 1974	United States
9	Dr. William McGrew	1974 – 1999	United States	McGrew Sports Center
10	Richard Jackson	1999 – 2009	United States	Jackson Hall
11	Dr. Hans Giesecke	2009 – 2012	United States
12	Dr. Panos Vlachos	2013 – present	Greece

== Εxtracurricular activities ==
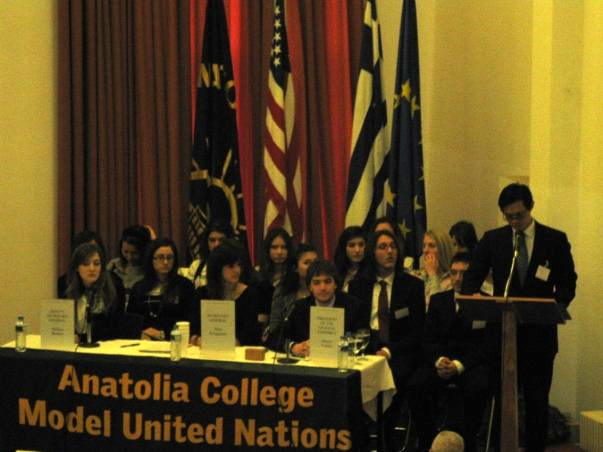
Anatolia College Model United Nations opening ceremony 2009

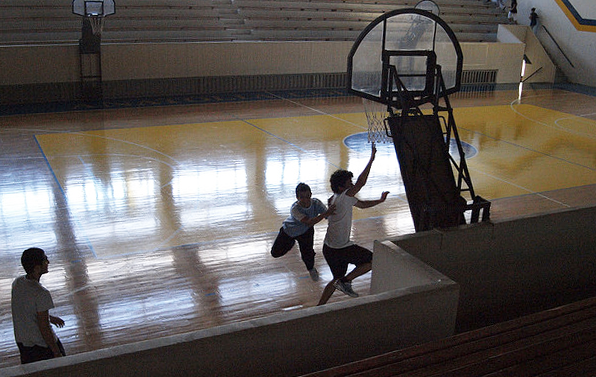
McGrew Sports Center indoors

=== Clubs ===
Anatolia College students are given a choice of over 100 clubs to join. Many students have earned national and international awards through participation in the school clubs, such as the Anatolia College Model United Nations, which is hosted annually, the Drama Club, which performs English musicals, and the Greek Drama Club, mostly performing comedies or ancient Greek plays. The college also has a presence at the Youth Parliament of Greece.

=== Sports tournaments ===
The Aegean Tournament is hosted every year at Anatolia College. Students from schools all over Greece attend and compete in sports. Field Day is also hosted once a year, and students of Anatolia College are given the opportunity to compete in sports, dance competitions and other such events. The school's sports teams have won awards on a national level.

== See also ==
- Anatolia College in Merzifon
- List of schools in Greece
- Robert College
- Koc School
