= Kara Mustafa Paşa Mosque =

Mosque in Amasya, Merzifon, Turkey

Paşa Mosque
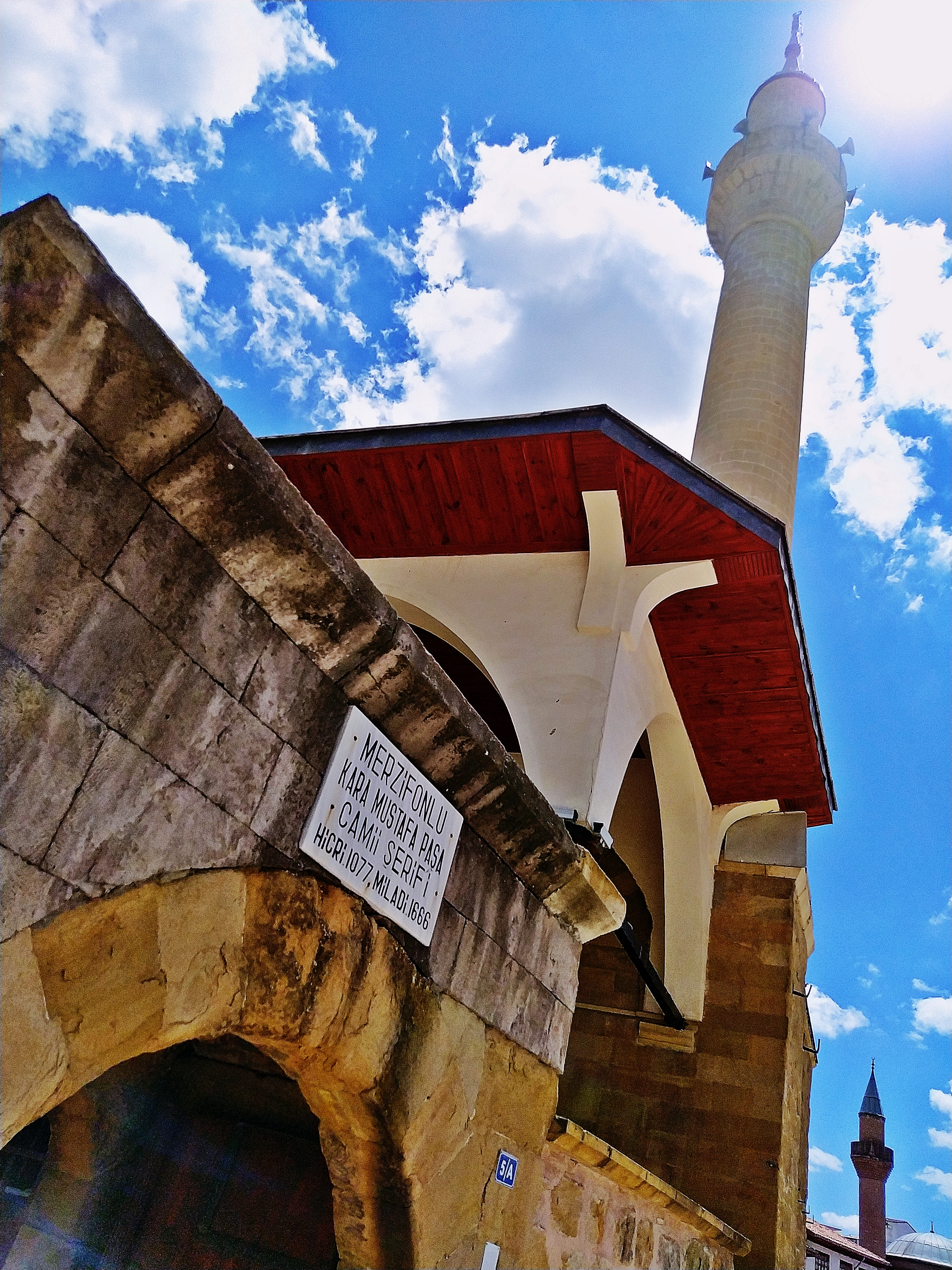

Religion
- Affiliation: Islam

Location
- Location: Amasya, Merzifon, Turkey
- Interactive map of Paşa Mosque
- Coordinates: 41°00′58″N 28°57′50″E

Architecture
- Type: Mosque
- Style: Ottoman architecture
- Completed: 1666
- Minaret: 1

The Kara Mustafa Paşa Mosque or Paşa Mosque (Turkish: Paşa Cami) is an historic mosque which situated in county central of Merzifon. It is the one of greatest mosque of the county which is still using as mosque.

== History ==
It was built in 1666 by Merzifonlu Kara Mustafa Paşa period of Ottoman Sultan Mehmed IV.

== Architecture ==
The Paşa Mosque has one main dome, one minaret and four secondary domes in corners. Main worship area of Mosque under main dome. Mosque have three series windows which illume by it.

== Gallery ==
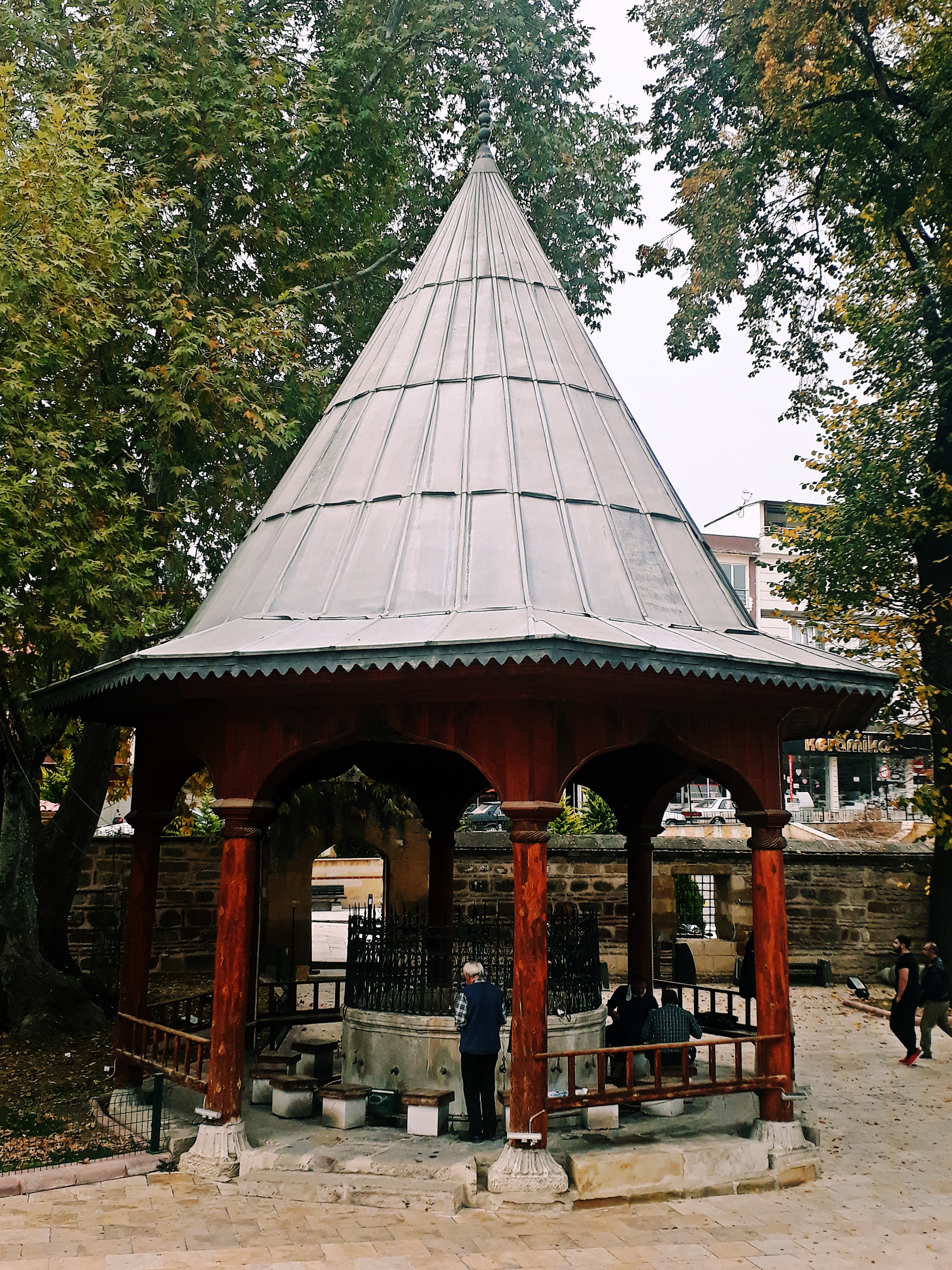
Fountain in the courtyard of the mosque

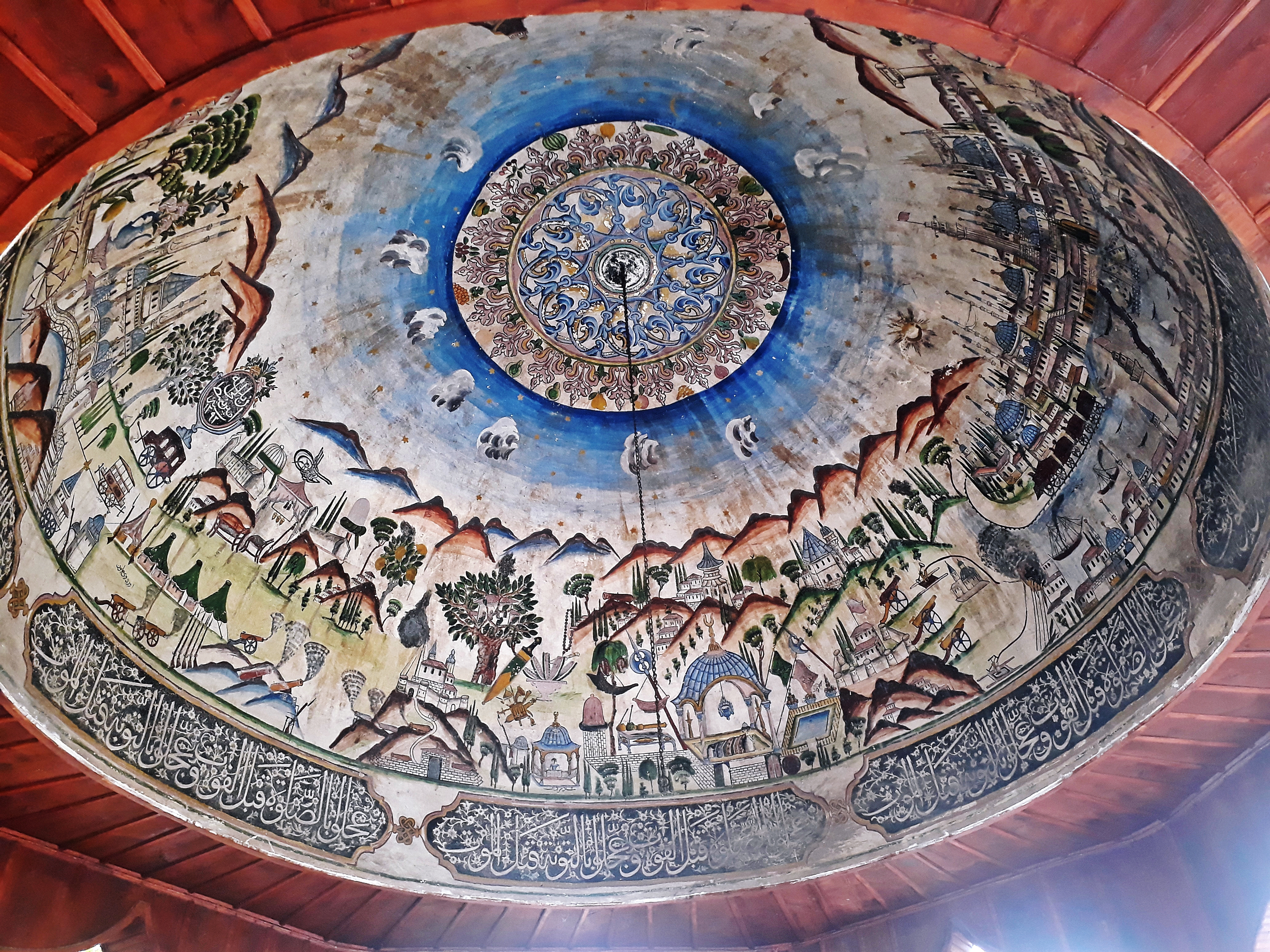
The landscape paintings made by Zileli Emin on the inside of the fountain cone are examples of "Late Ottoman painting art".

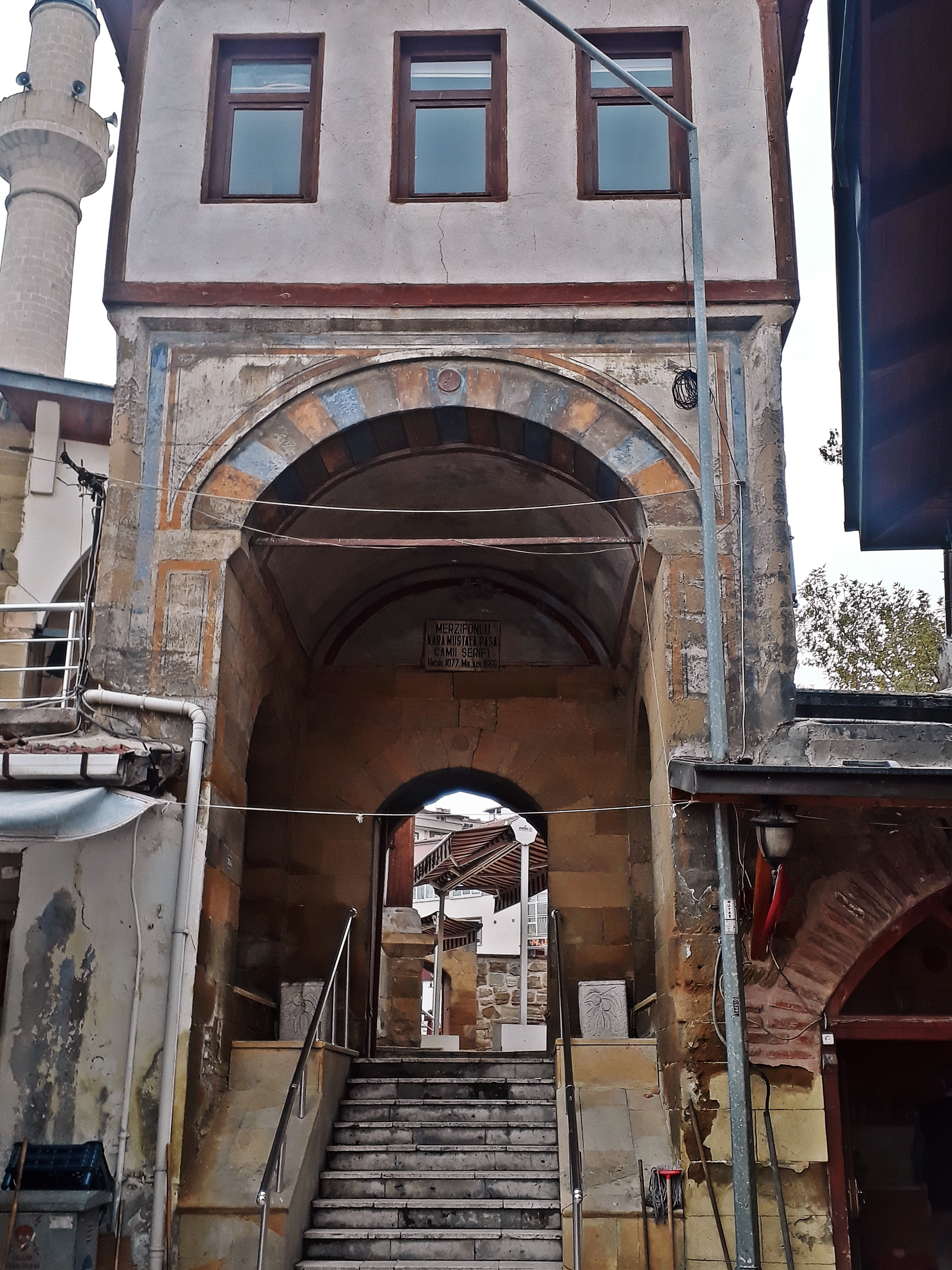
The entrance gate of the mosque courtyard by the historic covered bazaar

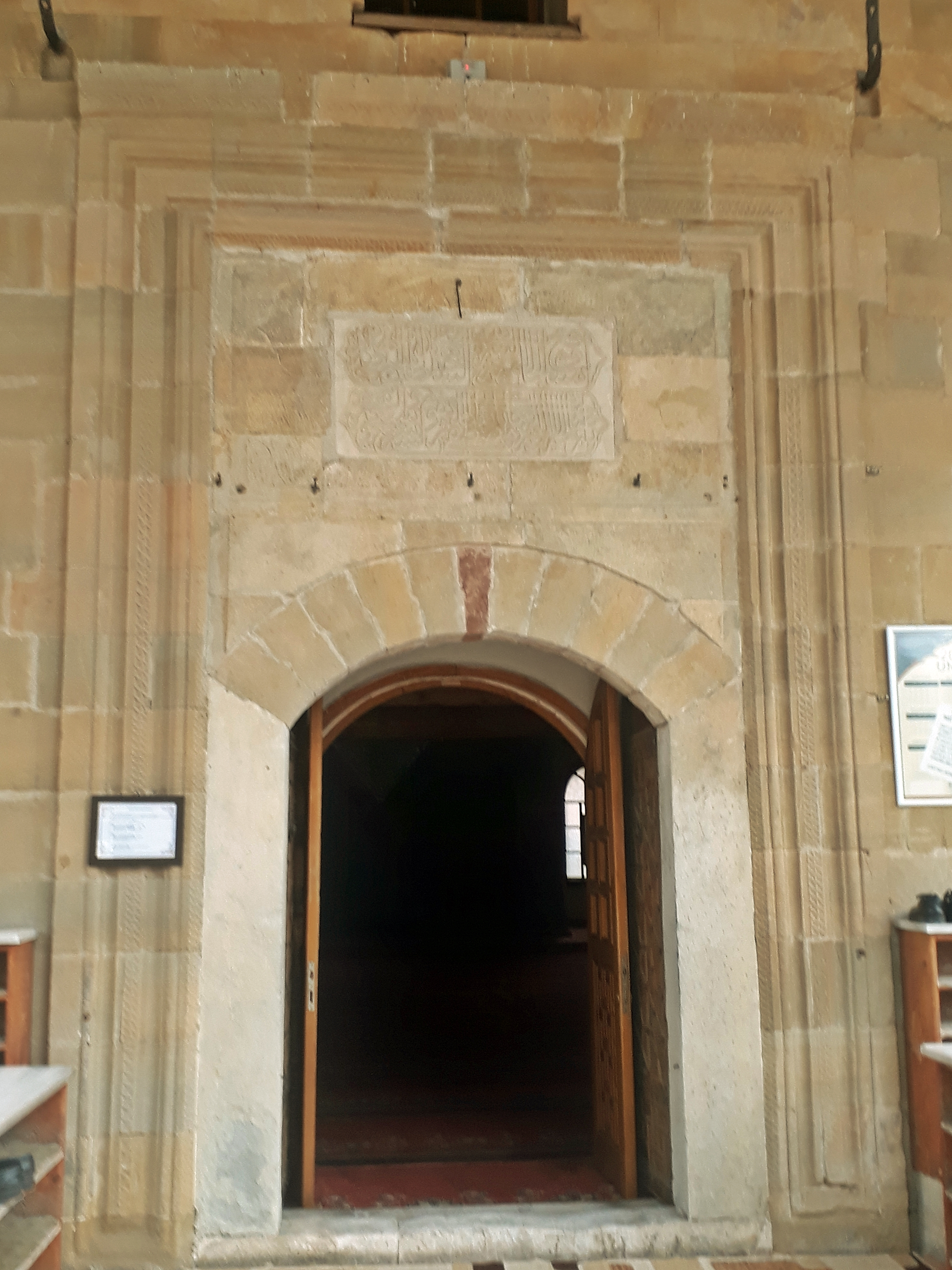
The entrance door of the mosque and its inscription

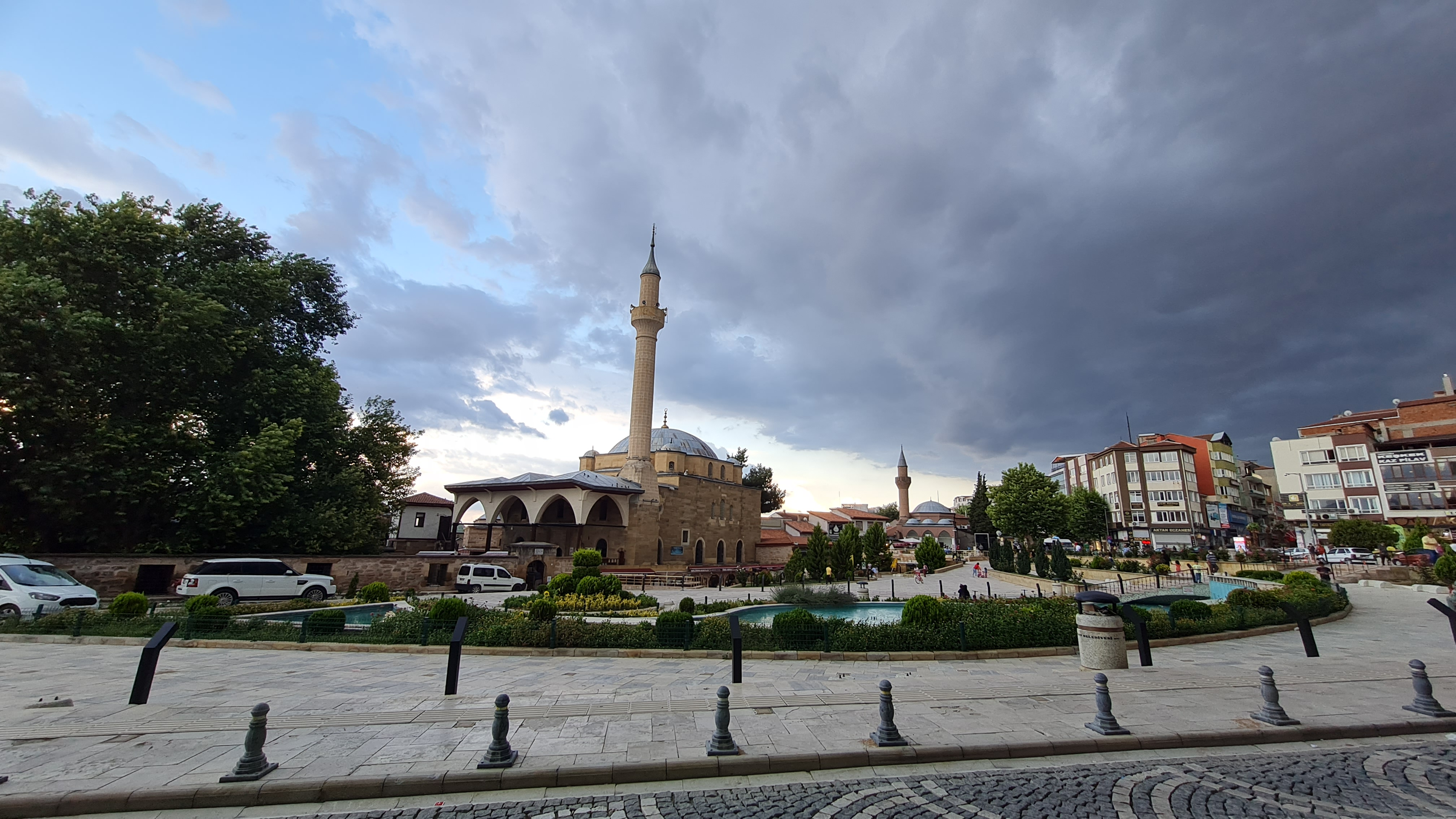
General view of the mosque

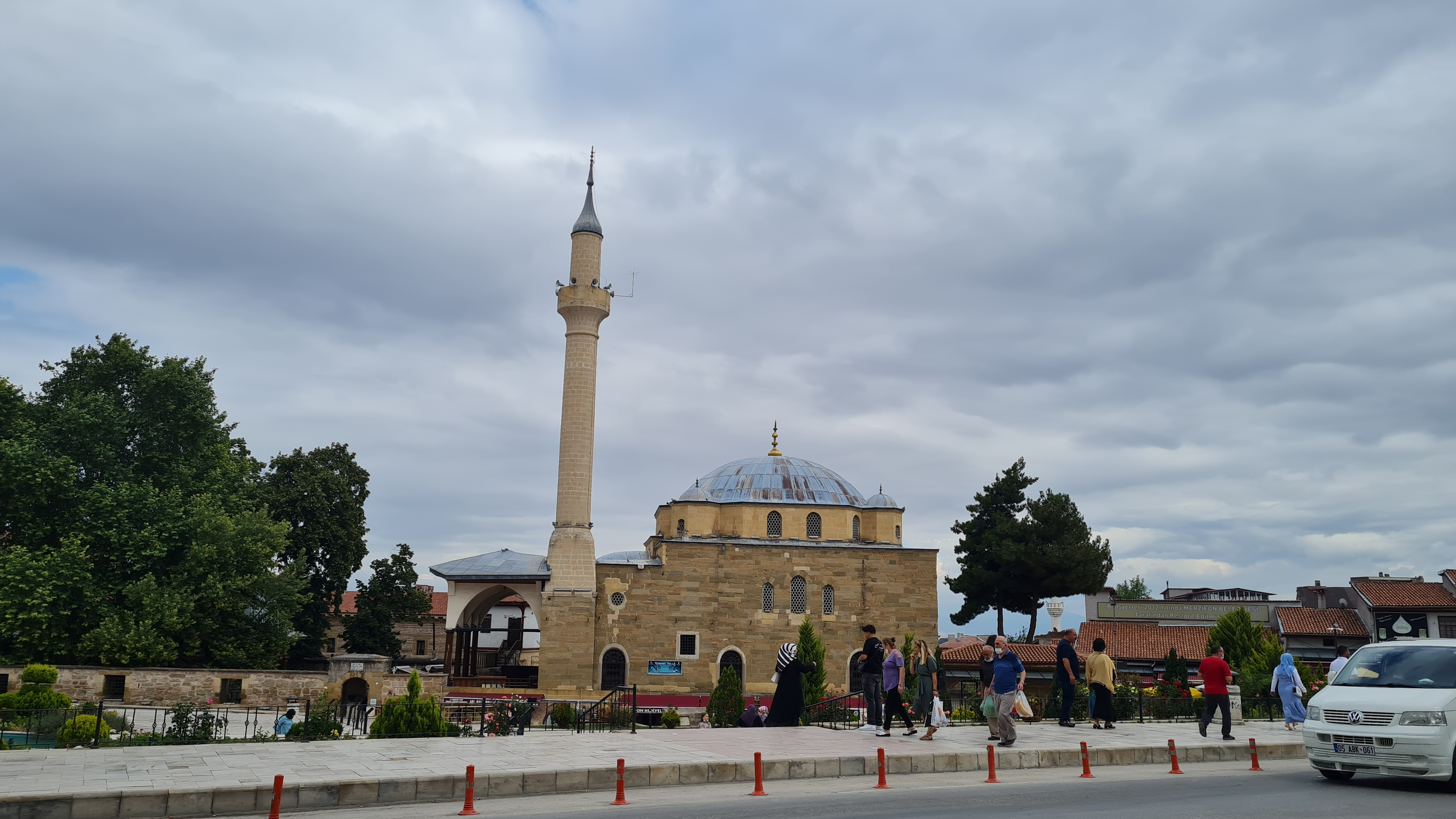
General view of the mosque

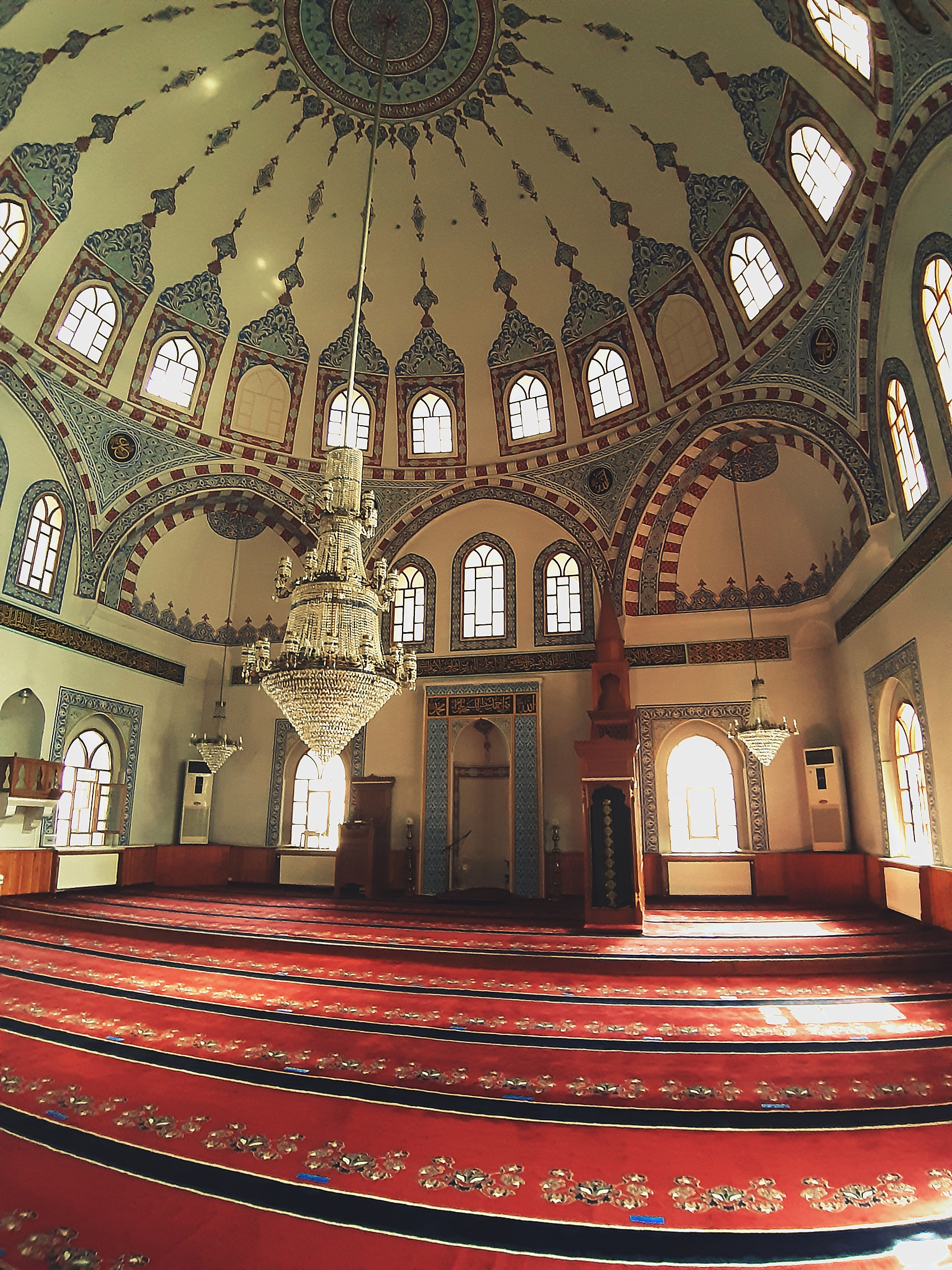
General view of the interior of the mosque

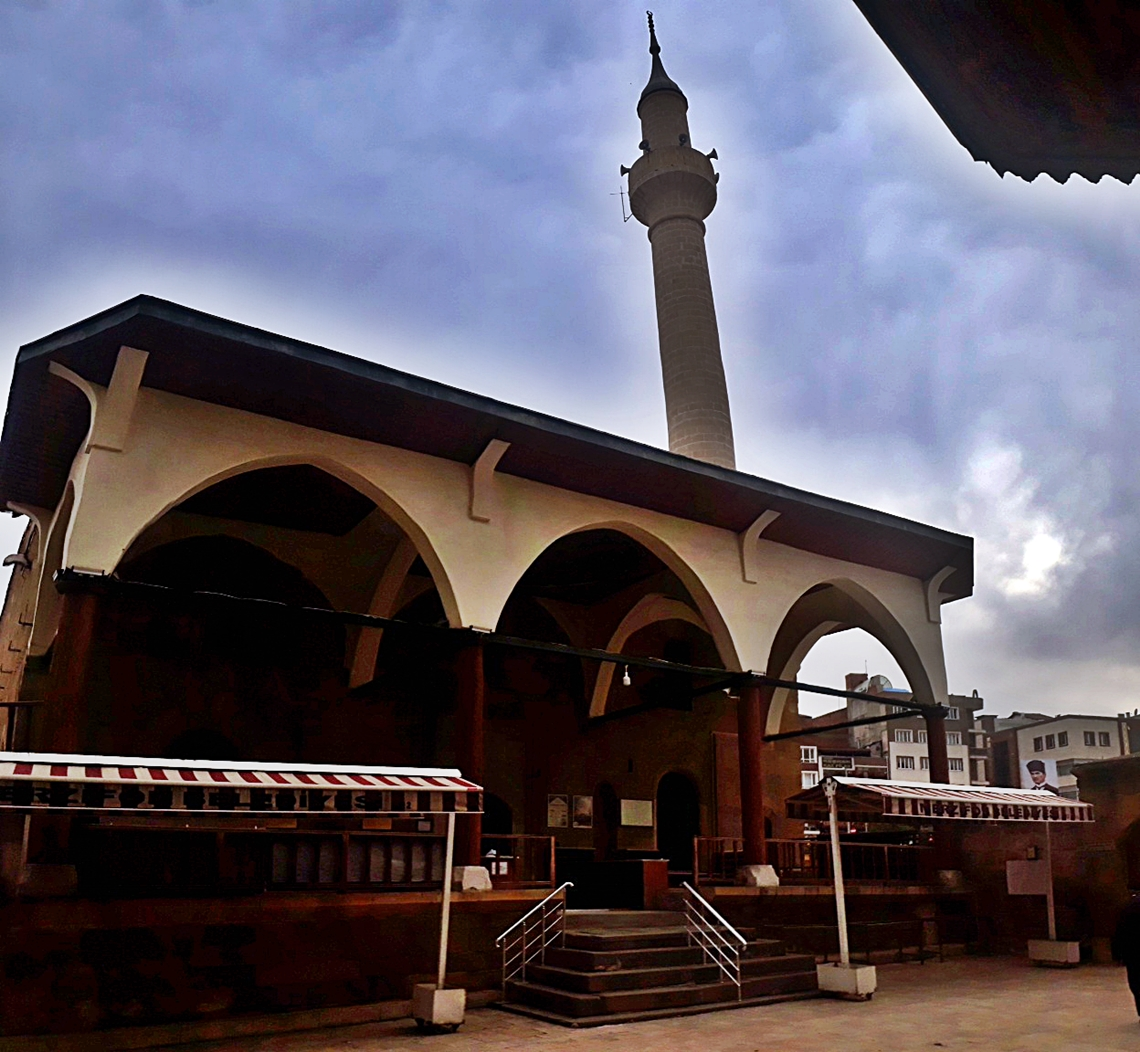
General view of the mosque

== See also ==
- List of mosques
- Mosques commissioned by the Ottoman dynasty
- Ottoman architecture
