= Amedeo Odoni =

Greek-American electrical engineer (born 1943)

Amedeo Odoni (born 1 May 1943) is the T. Wilson Chair Professor Emeritus of Aeronautics and Astronautics at Massachusetts Institute of Technology.

He was elected to the National Academy of Engineering in 2011 "for contributions and global leadership in air traffic control and airport systems" and to the 2004 class of Fellows of the Institute for Operations Research and the Management Sciences.

== Biography ==
Amedeo Odoni (https://aeroastro.mit.edu/faculty-research/faculty-list/amedeo-r-odoni) is the T. Wilson Chair Professor Emeritus of Aeronautics and Astronautics and of Civil and Environmental Engineering at MIT and distinguished visiting professor at the Singapore University of Technology and Design (SUTD). He joined the MIT faculty in 1969, after obtaining his Ph.D. (1969), SM (1967) and SB (1965) degrees in electrical engineering and operations research from MIT. Among other positions, he has served as co-director of MIT's Operations Research Center (1985–1991), of the Global Airline Industry Center (1999–2009) at MIT and of the FAA's National Center of Excellence in Aviation Operations Research (1996–2002). He has also served as editor-in-chief of Transportation Science (1986–1991) and as associate editor or board member of many scientific journals. He has 9 books and more than 100 professional publications to his credit, including the best-selling textbooks Urban Operations Research (co-authored with R. C. Larson), Airport Systems: Planning, Design, and Management (co-authored with R. de Neufville) and The Global Airline Industry (co-edited with P. Belobaba and C. Barnhhart). He has served as consultant to many of the busiest airports in the world, as well as to civil aviation authorities. Odoni is an elected member of the U.S. National Academy of Engineering, a Fellow of INFORMS, and the recipient of numerous awards for his teaching and research.

== Books ==
- Belobaba, P., A. Odoni and C. Barnhart (eds.), The Global Airline Industry, 2nd edition, John Wiley & Sons, London, 2013. (1st edition, 2009.)
- Larson, R. C. and A. Odoni, Urban Operations Research, Dynamic Ideas, Belmont, MA, 2007. Original edition by Prentice-Hall, Englewood Cliffs, New Jersey, 1981.
- de Neufville, R. and A. Odoni, Airport Systems: Planning, Design and Management, 2nd Edition, McGraw-Hill Educational, New York, 2013. 1st Edition, 2003.
- de Neufville, R. and A. Odoni, Airport Systems: Planning, Design and Management, McGraw-Hill, New York, 2003.
- Zografos, K., G. Andreatta and A. Odoni (eds.), Modeling and Managing Airport Performance, John Wiley & Sons, London, 2013.
- Bianco, L., A. Odoni and P. Dell’Olmo (eds.), New Concepts and Methods in Air Traffic Management, Springer, Berlin, 2001.
- Galati, G. and A. Odoni (eds.), Proceedings of the ATM ’99 Workshop: Advanced Technologies and Their Impact on Air Traffic Management in the 21st Century, Capri, Italy, September 1999.
- Bianco, L., A. Odoni and P. Dell’Olmo (eds.), Modeling and Simulation in Air Traffic Management, Springer, Berlin, 1997.
- Bianco, L. and A. Odoni (eds.) Large-Scale Computation and Information Processing in Air Traffic Control, Springer-Verlag, Berlin, 1993.
- Bianco, L., A. Odoni and G. Szego (eds.), Flow Control of Congested Networks, Springer-Verlag (Berlin, 1987).
- Odoni, A. and W. D. Davenport Jr., Solutions to Exercises in Probability and Random Processes, McGraw-Hill, New York, 1970.
