= Irene Georgakoudi =

Greek physicist

- Born: 7 June 1971 (age 55); Thessaloniki, Greece
- Education: Dartmouth College; University of Rochester
- Awards: Claflin Distinguished Scholar
- Scientific career
- Fields: Photonics, Medical imaging, Biomedical engineering, Biophysics
- Workplaces: Massachusetts Institute of Technology; Tufts University; Dartmouth College
- Thesis: Effects of photosensitizer bleaching and localization on photodynamic oxygen consumption and dosimetry (1999)
- Doctoral advisors: Prof Thomas H Foster
- Website: engineering.tufts.edu/bme/georgakoudi/

Irene Georgakoudi (born 7 June 1971) is a Greek biophysicist and Professor of Biomedical Engineering at Tufts University, where her work focuses on developing non-invasive medical imaging techniques based on optical spectroscopy for applications in medical diagnostics and therapeutics.

== Early life and education ==
Georgakoudi was born in Thessaloniki, Greece. She moved to the United States in 1989, obtaining a magna cum laude Bachelor's degree in physics at Dartmouth College in 1993. She completed her master's degree in biophysics at the University of Rochester in 1996.

She stayed at Rochester for her doctoral studies, investigating photodynamic therapy in Professor Tom Foster's group and completing her thesis in 1999.

Georgakoudi was awarded several university prizes and grants during her doctoral studies, including the Graduate Alumni Fellowship, Agnes M and George Messersmith Fellowship, and the William F Neuman Award in Biophysics. She also received the Graduate Student Society Leadership Award in 1997 for her involvement in the University of Rochester's Graduate Student Society.

== Research and career ==
Georgakoudi's research career has focused on developing new optical spectroscopy techniques for applications in medical imaging and the detection and treatment of different diseases.

She joined the Massachusetts Institute of Technology as a postdoctoral fellow in 1999, where her research studied how fluorescence spectroscopy could improve early cancer diagnosis as an imaging tool for observing changes in cell growth. In 2003, she moved to the Wellman Center for Photomedicine at Massachusetts General Hospital, Harvard Medical School where she received the Claflin Distinguished Scholar Award for her work.

In 2004, she joined Tufts University, where she was a Professor of Biomedical Engineering. Her research used developing optical techniques to image human tissue, providing non-invasive ways to monitor changes in cellular metabolism and diagnose diseases such as diabetes, cancer, and neurodegenerative disorders.

In 2024, she joined Dartmouth College, where she is Professor of Engineering and co-director of the Translational Engineering in Cancer Research Program at the Dartmouth Cancer Center.

== Awards and honours ==
- Fellow of the International Society for Optics and Photonics (SPIE), 2020
- Fellow of the Optical Society of America, 2016
- Fellow of the American Institute for Medical and Biological Engineering, 2015
- NSF Career Award for Non-invasive modalities for optical imaging of cell-matrix interactions in engineered tissues, 2006-2011
- Claflin Distinguished Scholar Award, Massachusetts General Hospital, Harvard Medical School, 2004
