= Anatolia College in Merzifon =

American missionary college in Anatolia

Coordinates: 40°52′50″N 35°27′43″E

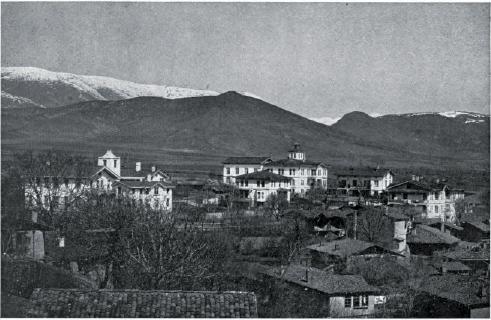
Anatolia College of Marsovan

The Anatolia College in Merzifon or American College of Mersovan (Turkish: Merzifon Amerikan Koleji) was a 4-year college, high school, theological seminary, orphanage and hospital located in the town of Merzifon in the Sivas Vilayet of the Ottoman Empire (in modern-day Amasya Province, Turkey). Classes were offered to both male and female students. Established by American missionaries, the college existed from 1886 to 1924. The college was essentially destroyed during the Armenian genocide in 1915. Reopened in 1919, it was subsequently relocated to Thessaloniki, Greece in 1921, and still operates as Anatolia College.

== Theological seminary ==
The American Board of Commissioners for Foreign Missions established the school in 1864 as a theological seminary after the American college in Bebek, Istanbul, the later Robert College, abandoned its theological training and concentrated in only general education due to growing number of young people interested in English language. The school in Merzifon served in the beginning to educate the children of the Greek and Armenian community in Anatolia, who wanted to become pastors or preachers.

== College ==
In 1886, as more and more young people wanted a general education, the program at the theological seminary in Merzifon was expanded to include a four-year liberal arts college. The institution was named Anatolia College, and Charles Tracy became the first president, serving until 1912. By 1911 six languages were regularly taught and used in the college, and that year 282 students attended from 16 provinces of Turkey, as well as Greece, Crete, Cyprus, Egypt, and Russia. The faculty, in which Americans formed a minority, exercised substantial direction over the academic program. The college's motto was "The Morning Cometh" referring to the ancient Greek word for dawn, as well as the region "Anatolia". The college seal showed the sun rising over lofty Akdağ at the eastern end of the Merzifon Plain. Students, principally Greek and Armenian, came most from outside of Merzifon and boarded at the school. The faculty was Greek, Armenian, and American. The half-German J. J. Manissadijan was Professor of Botany and also founded a college museum. During 1911 - 15 multiple new buildings were added, including North College in 1912; the Alumni Library-Museum in 1914; and the Kennedy Home and Superintendent's House in 1915. A deep well and water system, including a hamam (Turkish bathhouse) used by hundreds every week, and a large flour mill and granaries, along with residential units, were also in place by 1915. Foundations were built for the Union Hall and George Hills White Hall, but never finished. The library grew to include 10,000 books and 40 periodicals.

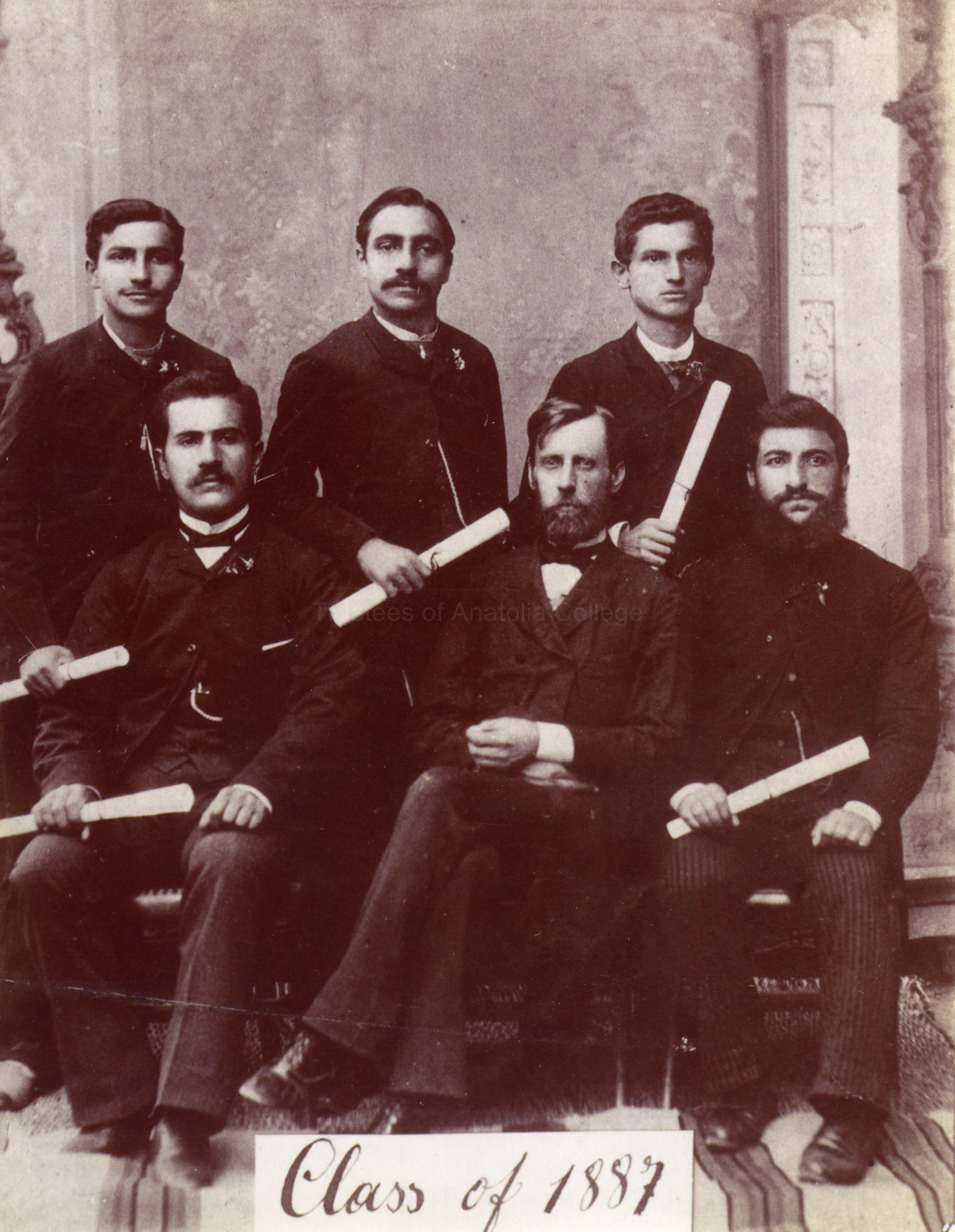

During 1913–14, the faculty listed 32 names, including 11 Armenians, 10 Americans, 9 Greeks, 1 Russian, and 1 Swiss. That year there were 425 students, of whom 300 were boarders, including 200 Greeks, 160 Armenians, 40 Russians, and 25 Turks. The evolving curriculum, originally intended to prepare graduates for further instruction, preferably at the Marsovan Seminary, was progressively redesigned to meet student demand for occupational training, emphasizing three areas: languages, the major arts and sciences taught in American colleges, and subjects relating to business and public administration as practiced in Turkey. The Anatolia Girls School evolved as a self-contained institution with its own premises covering over four-and-a-half acres on the southern section of the mission compound, including classrooms, dormitory, gymnasium, teachers' quarters, athletic courts, and surrounding gardens. The Girls School aspired to develop self-respect and strong character among its charges, while providing education formerly restricted to males. Over half the students came from Marsovan as day students, accounting for the high proportion of Armenians to Greeks. When Armenian activists posted broadsides in 1893, Ottoman troops jailed many Armenians and damaged some college buildings; accusing Armenian students and teachers of being in contact with the rebels. The damage was rebuilt later with compensation paid by the Ottoman Government.

In 1915 the Armenian genocide came to Merzifon. That spring and summer, initially rights were restricted, then property was seized, and then hundreds of Armenians and Christians were seized and removed from the town. On August 10, 1915, forces of the Turkish Ottoman Empire broke into the Anatolia College campus and seized Armenian Christian faculty and students. Many were murdered on the spot; the others were marched off for "deportation" (in fact a death march). Those "deported" were never heard from again. This atrocity became known to the west when George White, President of the college at the time, returned to the United States and described the scene, resulting in The New York Times article "Armenians Killed with Axes by Turks—Members of the Faculty at Anatolia College Among More than 1200 Slain at Marsovan." That article begins:

The slaughter of all the Armenian Faculty members of Anatolia College, Marsovan, Northern Asia Minor, with 1,200 others, by Turkish peasants, whose pay for the work was the privilege of stripping the clothing off their victims’ bodies, was described by the Rev. George E. White, President of the college, upon his return to the United States in the autumn of 1917. The massacres were committed at night by the order of the Turkish Government, he said, the Armenians being sent out in lots of hundred or two hundred to their doom and their bodies rolled into prepared burial trenches.

In the wake of the Armenian genocide the college took in and cared for hundreds of orphaned children of murdered Armenian parents. The college was for the most part closed until after World War I.

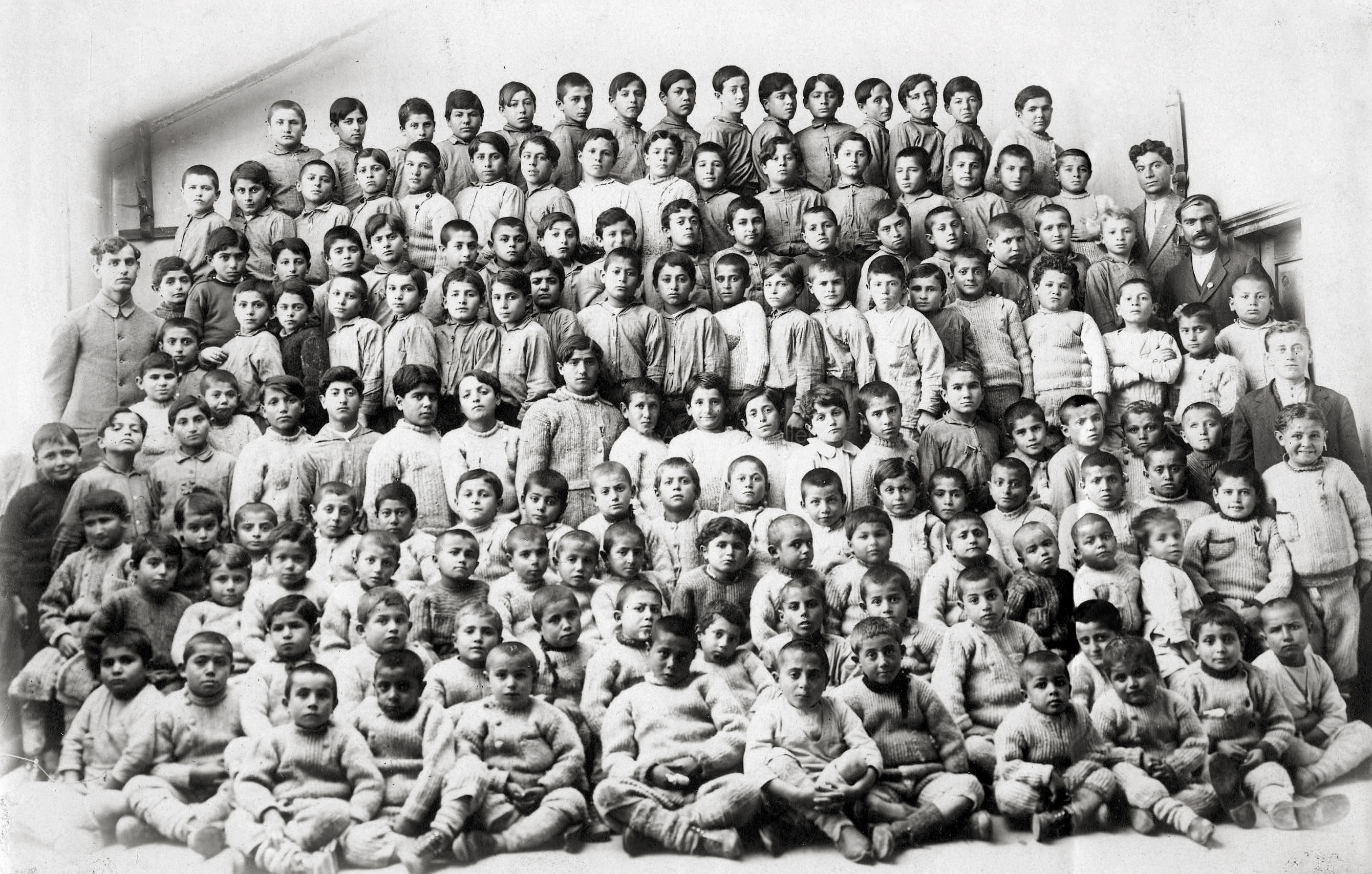
Armenian orphans of the Marsovan Anatolian College in 1918

After the end of the WWI, the facilities of the college at the campus consisted of a kindergarten, a school for the Deaf, a college-level program, one of the largest hospitals in Asia Minor, and an orphanage for 2,000 orphans in addition to the theological seminary and high schools for boys and girls, all housed in more than 40 buildings of New England style. The activities of the American missionaries came de facto to an end with the collapse of the Ottoman Empire in 1918.

In 1921, Turkish nationalists under Mustafa Kemal executed three teachers and several students of the college during the "Amasya trials".

== Relocation to Greece ==
After the Greco-Turkish War (1919–1922) and subsequent population exchange between Greece and Turkey, the college was closed in Merzifon to be reopened in Thessaloniki, Greece in 1924, as Anatolia College.

The college museum closed in 1939 and 130 of Manissadjian's plants from his collection, went sent to the Herbarium of Ankara University, Faculty of Science.

== Books about the college ==
George E. White, an American missionary who was a teacher from 1890 and president from 1913 until 1921 at the school in Merzifon, wrote his memories in a book Adventuring With Anatolia College, published in 1940.

Bertha B. Morley, an American music teacher at Anatolia College in 1913–1915, kept a diary which has been edited into the volume: "Marsovan 1915: The Diaries of Bertha Morley," consisting of her 1915 entries. She describes the destruction of the Marsovan Armenian community; the arrest of Armenian intellectuals; and the methodical deportations and eventual destruction of deportees. Morley narrates how Armenian property was plundered by Ottoman local and central officials and how Armenian women and children were forced to convert and be absorbed into Muslim households. She also testifies to the efforts of Ottoman authorities to conceal their criminal activities.

In 2015, Wiliam McGrew, the college's ninth president (1974-1999), published an extensive historical account of the institution in Turkey and Greece under the title Educating across Cultures: Anatolia College in Turkey and Greece (Rowman & Littelfield, Lanham, Boulder, New York, London).

== See also ==
- Anatolia College
- List of missionary schools in Turkey
- List of high schools in Turkey
- Education in the Ottoman Empire
