= John D. Nutting =

American Congregationalist minister and missionary

Reverend John Danforth Nutting
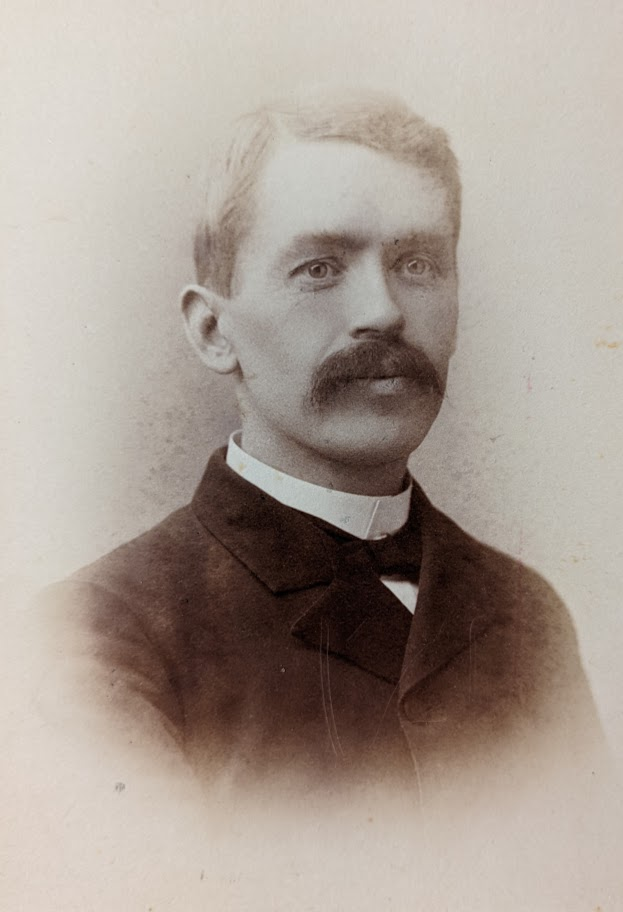
- Portrait of John D. Nutting
- Born: 1854; Randolph Center, Vermont
- Died: 1949 (aged 94–95)
- Burial place: Cleveland, Ohio
- Education: M.A.
- Alma mater: Wheaton College, Oberlin Theological Seminary
- Occupations: Minister, Secretary of the Utah Gospel Mission
- Known for: Founder of Utah Gospel Mission, anti-Mormonism
- Spouse: Lillis Russel Morley Nutting
- Religion: Congregationalism
- Ordained: 1885
- Congregations served: Plymouth Congregational Church
- Title: Secretary, Utah Gospel Mission

John Danforth Nutting (March 8, 1854 – October 4, 1949) was a Congregationalist minister, as well as Founder and Secretary of the Utah Gospel Mission, a missionary organization that operated in Utah evangelizing to Mormons from 1900 to 1950. He was a prolific author of anti-Mormon books and pamphlets.

== Early life ==
Nutting was born in Randolph Center, Vermont to Rufus Nutting II, a maker of reed organs, and Sarah H. Nutting, Principal of the Art Department at Wheaton College. The Nutting family relocated to Illinois because his parents wanted their children to "be able to attend a truly Christian college... unhampered by 'secret societies.'" John D. Nutting achieved a B.A. in 1878, and an M.A. in 1881, both from Wheaton College.

== Ministry ==
Nutting went on to study at the Oberlin Theological Seminary where he was ordained as a Congregationalist Minister in 1885. In 1885 he married Nannie Keith Miller, who died in childbirth a year later. He went on to Minister at Congregationalist churches in Wauseon, Ohio (1886-1888), Newport, Kentucky (1888-1890), and St. Louis, Missouri (1890-1892). In January 1890, he married Lillis Russel Morley of Mentor, Ohio.

=== Ministry in Utah ===
Nutting and his family moved to Salt Lake City in 1890 to take up a position as minister of the Plymouth Congregational Church in Salt Lake City, Utah. He remained minister there from 1892 to 1898. During that time "he began to study Mormonism and to assess the difficulty of reaching Mormons with the Protestant message. A new kind of Christian missionary work was called for. His fellow ministers "commissioned Mr. Nutting to 'go back east' and find out what could be done."

=== Utah Gospel Mission ===
In 1900, Nutting founded the Utah Gospel Mission, which was a Congregationalist organization that used Mormon missionary methods to evangelize to the Mormons. They recruited "wagon missionaries" to travel in groups of two (first in canvas-covered wagons, later in automobiles) to Mormon areas of Utah, Idaho, Wyoming, and Montana. They evangelized directly to homes, distributed literature, and held meetings. Imitating the Mormon evangelizing techniques, these missionaries had their living expenses paid but were not given a salary.

Nutting directly coordinated the travels of Utah Gospel Mission missionaries. Their greatest level of activity was achieved in the 1930s. By 1935, "381,510 house-to-house calls had been made, over forty-five million pages of literature had been distributed, and over forty thousand Bibles had been sold or given away." Despite this, their efforts had little success.

== Death and legacy ==
Nutting died in 1949 in Cleveland Ohio. His wife Lillis took over operations of the Utah Gospel Mission until her death in 1961. While the Utah Gospel Mission was ultimately not very successful in its goals, it generated a photographic record of early Mormon life that is held at Bowling Green State University.

John D. Nutting's papers are held in the Archives of Wheaton College. Additional materials about Nutting and the Utah Gospel Mission are held at the Bowling Green State University archives.

The house built by John D. Nutting and Lillis Nutting is an historic landmark in Salt Lake City.

== Works ==
Nutting published dozens of anti-Mormon books and pamphlets. He also edited and published "Light on Mormonism" newspaper, and the Utah Gospel Mission newsletter.

- Articles of Faith of the "Latter-Day Saints" NYC: League of Social Service, (1899?)
- What Congress can do about Roberts, Mormon Mendacity (no publication data, printed c. 1899)
- Some Extracts from Secret oaths & ceremonies of the Mormon Church (no publication data, printed c. 1899)
- The Truth About the Origin of the Book of Mormon. San Bernardino: Harry A. McGimsey; (1900)
- The New Effort in Behalf of Utah Cleveland, OH: Utah Gospel Mission; (1900)
- The Private Doctrines of Mormon theology Cleveland, OH: Utah Gospel Mission; (1900)
- The True Mormon Doctrine (1901) https://archive.org/details/truemormondoctri00nutt
- Greater Points of Christian Truth... by... student of... Mormonism (1901)
- A Journey Among the Mormons (1901)
- Mormonism Proclaiming Itself a Fraud (1901)
- Main Facts Regarding the Growth and Power of Mormonism (1902)
- The Story of a Mormon Convert (1903)
- Present Day Mormonism and its Remedy (1904)
- Religious Destitution in a "Christian Country" (1907) https://archive.org/details/religiousdestitu00nutt
- To Prevent the Spread of Mormonism (1907) https://archive.org/details/topreventspreado00nutt/page/n1/mode/2up
- The Wonderful Story of the Wonderful Book (1908)
- My Field of Labor: Where Does God Call Me? (1910) https://archive.org/details/myfieldoflaborwh00nutt
- Why I could Never be a Mormon (1911) https://books.google.com/books?id=6nrE0uYk-PcC&q=john%20d.%20nutting
- The Private Doctrines of Mormon Theology (1912)
- The Secret oaths and Ceremonies of Mormonism (1912)
- Incidents and Anecdotes Illustrating Mormonism (1912, rep 1915)
- Mormonism To-Day and Its Remedy (1913)
- Money and Our Utah Work (1913) https://archive.org/details/moneyourutahwork00nuttrich
- The Real Doctrines of Mormonism (1921)
- The Guard's Great Question (pre-1922)
- The Truth About God (pre-1922)
- Mormon Doctrine and Christian Truth (pre-1922)
- Thoughts About Heaven (pre-1922)
- Special Difficulties of Christian Work Among Mormons (pre-1922)
- Josephite or "Reorganized" Mormonism (pre-1922)
- The Fraud of the "Inspired Translation" (pre-1922)
- Mormon Twistings of the Bible (pre-1922)
- Reorganized or Josephite Mormonism, Carefully Considered (1922)
- Paul's Method of Dealing with False Religionists (1927?)
- Teachings of Mormonism and Christianity Compared (1928, rep 1931)
- The Road to Glory-Land (1929? rep 1931)
- Why Care about Mormonism? (1931)
- What We do in the West (1931)
- Oliver Cowdery's Renunciation of Mormonism (pre-1932)
- Mormon Morals (pre-1932)
- The Truth About God (pre-1932)
- Who First Acknowledged Polygamy? (pre-1932)
- The Mormon's Mistake (pre-1932)
- How to Meet the Mormon Need and Danger (1937?)
- Eight Reasons why no one should be a Mormon (1939?)
- If not Much, then a Little! (1940?)
- Why? (1940)
- Some Soul-stirring Reasons for Knowing... Mormon Issue (1943)
- Contradictions in Mormon Books and Doctrines (1934? rep 1942)
