= Postiella =

Scientific classification
- Kingdom: Plantae
- Clade: Tracheophytes
- Clade: Angiosperms
- Clade: Eudicots
- Clade: Asterids
- Order: Apiales
- Family: Apiaceae
- Subfamily: Apioideae
- Tribe: Pyramidoptereae
- Genus: Postiella; Kljuykov

Genus of flowering plants

Postiella is a monotypic genus of flowering plants belonging to the family Apiaceae. It only contains one known species, Postiella capillifolia (Post) Kljuykov

Its native range is Eastern Mediterranean and is found in Lebanon and Syria.

The genus name of Postiella is in honour of George Edward Post (1838–1909), who was an American surgeon, academic and botanist.

The genus was circumscribed by Evgeniy Vasilyevich Kljuykov in Byull. Moskovsk. Obshch. Isp. Prir., Otd. Biol. vol.90 (Issue 2) on page 103 in 1985.
