= Alfred Charles Post =

American surgeon (1806–1886)

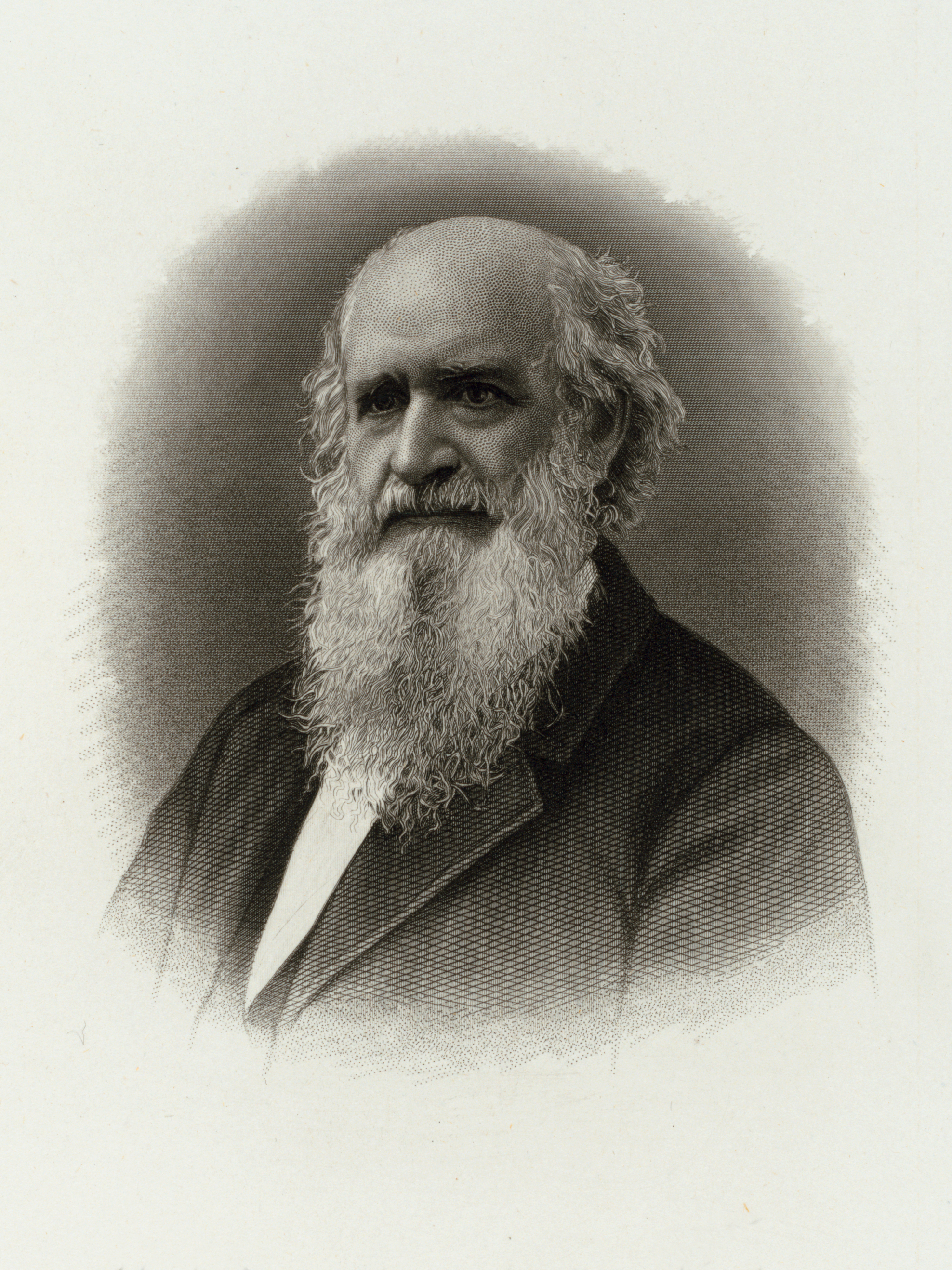
Alfred C. Post

Alfred Charles Post (January 13, 1806 – February 7, 1886) was an American surgeon.

Post was born in New York City. He graduated from Columbia College in 1822 and from the Columbia University College of Physicians and Surgeons in 1827, studied in Paris, Vienna, Berlin, and London (1827–29).

Post was professor in the Castleton Medical College (of ophthalmic surgery, 1842–44, and of surgery, 1844-51), professor of surgery in New York University (1851–75), emeritus professor (1875–86), and president of the medical faculty (1873–86). He was a fellow of the Academy of Medicine, of which he was president in 1867–68. Post wrote Observations on the Cure of Stammering (1841). He was an inventor of several surgical instruments and appliances.

In 1831, he married Harriet Beers (1809–1877), daughter of Cyrenius Beers, and had eleven children, one of whom was George Edward Post (1838–1909).
