= Smith's Bible Dictionary =

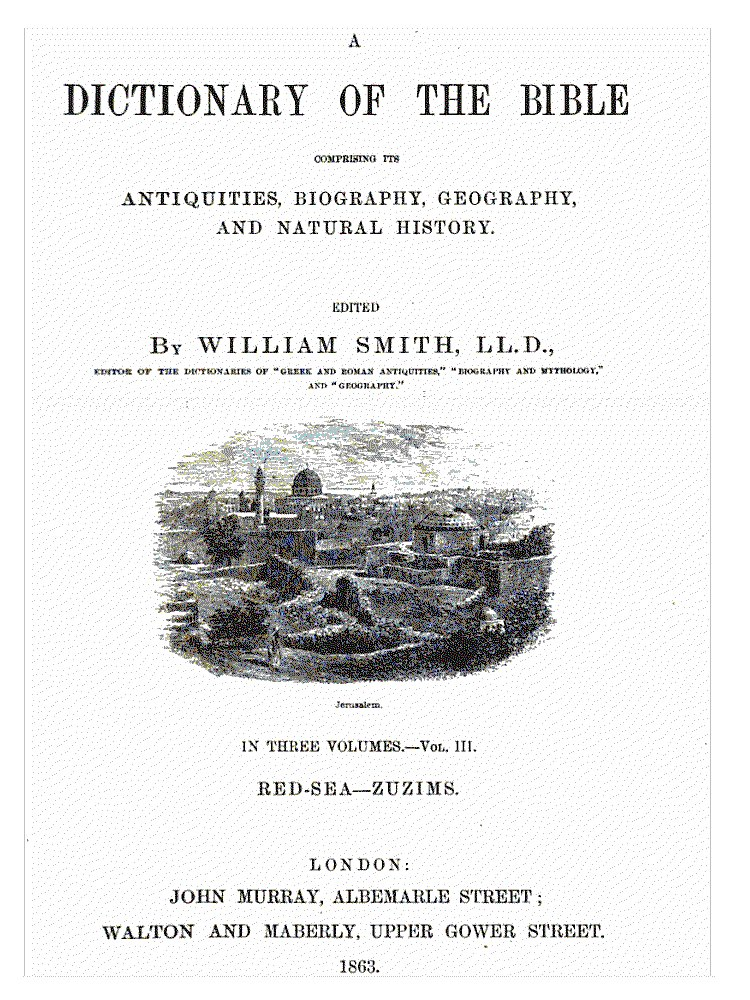
Smith's Bible Dictionary, 1863

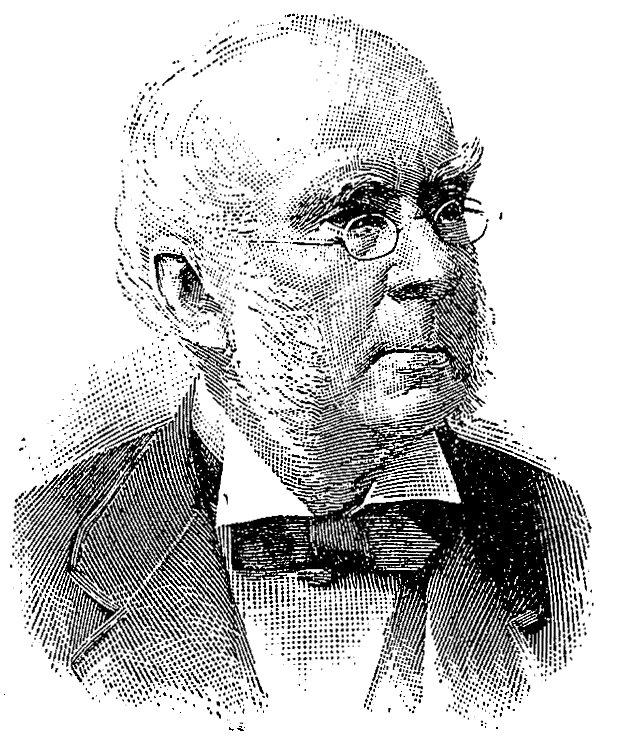
Sir William Smith.

Smith's Bible Dictionary, originally named A Dictionary of the Bible, is a 19th-century Bible dictionary containing upwards of four thousand entries that became named after its editor, William Smith. Its popularity was such that condensed dictionaries appropriated the title, "Smith's Bible Dictionary".

== Overview ==
The original dictionary was published as a three-volume set in 1857 in London by J. Murray, followed by a second edition in 1863, in London and Boston, USA. This was followed by A Concise Dictionary of the Bible (1865), intended for the general reader and students, and A Smaller Dictionary of the Bible (1866), for use in schools. A Comprehensive Dictionary of the Bible (1868), was published simultaneously in London and New York, and a four-volume Dictionary of the Bible (1871), was published in Boston, amongst other things incorporating the appendices of the first edition into the main body of the text.

In the UK, a corresponding second edition of the first volume in two parts, edited by Smith and J. M. Fuller, was published in 1893.

The original publications are now in the public domain; some derivative, commercial versions are still in copyright.

Noted contributors to the dictionary include Harold Browne, bishop of Ely; Charles J. Ellicott, bishop of Gloucester and Bristol; and the Cambridge scholars J. B. Lightfoot, William W. Selwyn, and Brooke Foss Westcott, who would later become bishop of Durham.

One of the American contributors was George Edward Post, a medical doctor and botanist (of the American University of Beirut (AUB)).

== Editions ==
- A Dictionary of the Bible, edited by William Smith (3 volumes: London, John Murray, 1863).
- A Concise Dictionary of the Bible, edited by William Smith (London, John Murray, 1865).
- A Smaller Dictionary of the Bible, edited by William Smith (London, John Murray, 1866).
- A Comprehensive Dictionary of the Bible, edited by Samuel Barnum (New York, Appleton; London, Little Britain, 1868).
- A Dictionary of the Bible, edited by H. B. Hackett (4 volumes: New York, Hurd and Houghton, 1871).
- A Dictionary of the Bible, edited by William Smith and J. M. Fuller, 2nd edition (vol. 1 part I, vol. 1 part II: London, John Murray, 1893).
- A Dictionary of the Bible, revised and edited by Rev. F. N. Peloubet and M. A. Peloubet, "with the latest researches and references to the Revised Version of the New Testament" (Philadelphia: Porter and Coates, 1884; Reprint: Philadelphia: John C. Winston Co., 1948).

== See also ==
- Public domain resources
- Easton's Bible Dictionary (1897), another popular 19th-century Bible dictionary
