= George Edward Post =

American botanist (1838–1909)

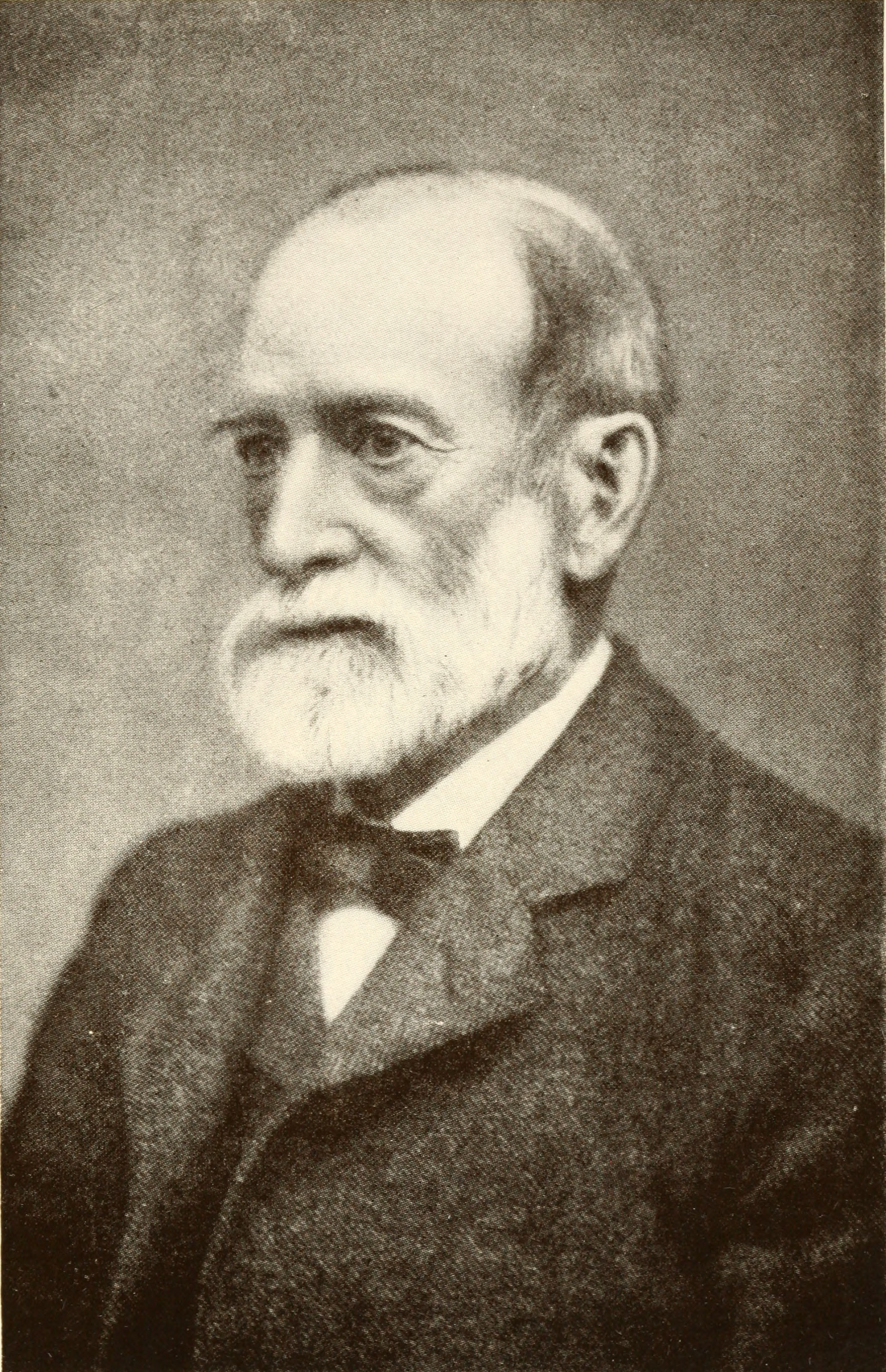
- Born: December 17, 1838; New York City, US
- Died: September 30, 1909 (aged 70); Beirut, Syria
- Education: University College of New York
- Occupations: Surgeon; naturalist
- Father: Alfred Charles Post
- Awards: Order of the Red Eagle

George Edward Post (1838–1909) was an American surgeon, academic and botanist.

== Biography ==
George Edward Post was born in New York City on December 17, 1838, the son of Alfred Charles Post.

He was a professor of surgery at the Syrian Protestant College in Beirut, which became the American University of Beirut (AUB). He had originally graduated from University College of New York.

During 1860, he worked as a missionary doctor in Syria.

He later published 18 articles in Arabic, including Arabic Dictionary of the Holy Bible, Classification and Study of Principles of Plant Physiology and Function and Rules of How to Succeed and translated two texts from Arabic into English. Post published broadly in the areas of natural history, medicine, and theology. Post formally described 221 taxa, and published an extensive volume on the Flora of Syria, Palestine and Sinai in 1896. He was also one of the contributors to Smith's Bible Dictionary, in 1893. Later, a new and revised edition of Post's seminal work was published posthumously in 1932–1933 by John Edward Dinsmore, entitled Flora of Syria, Palestine, and Sinai: Volume 1: A Handbook of The Flowering Plants and Ferns, Native and Naturalized From The Taurus to Ras Muhammad And From the Mediterranean Sea to The Syrian Desert, Vol I and II, and which includes a description of many new plants, including Iris hermona.

In 1875, Pierre Edmond Boissier and Charles Isidore Blanche published Postia (in the Asteraceae family), it is now a synonym of Rhanteriopsis lanuginosa. Then in 1985, botanist Evgeniy Vasilyevich Kljuykov published Postiella, which is a monotypic genus of flowering plants belonging to the family Apiaceae and named in Post's honour.

For his work as a surgeon and missionary, he received the Order of the Red Eagle from the Kingdom of Prussia.

He died in Beirut on September 30, 1909.

The standard author abbreviation Post is used to indicate this person as the author when citing a botanical name.
