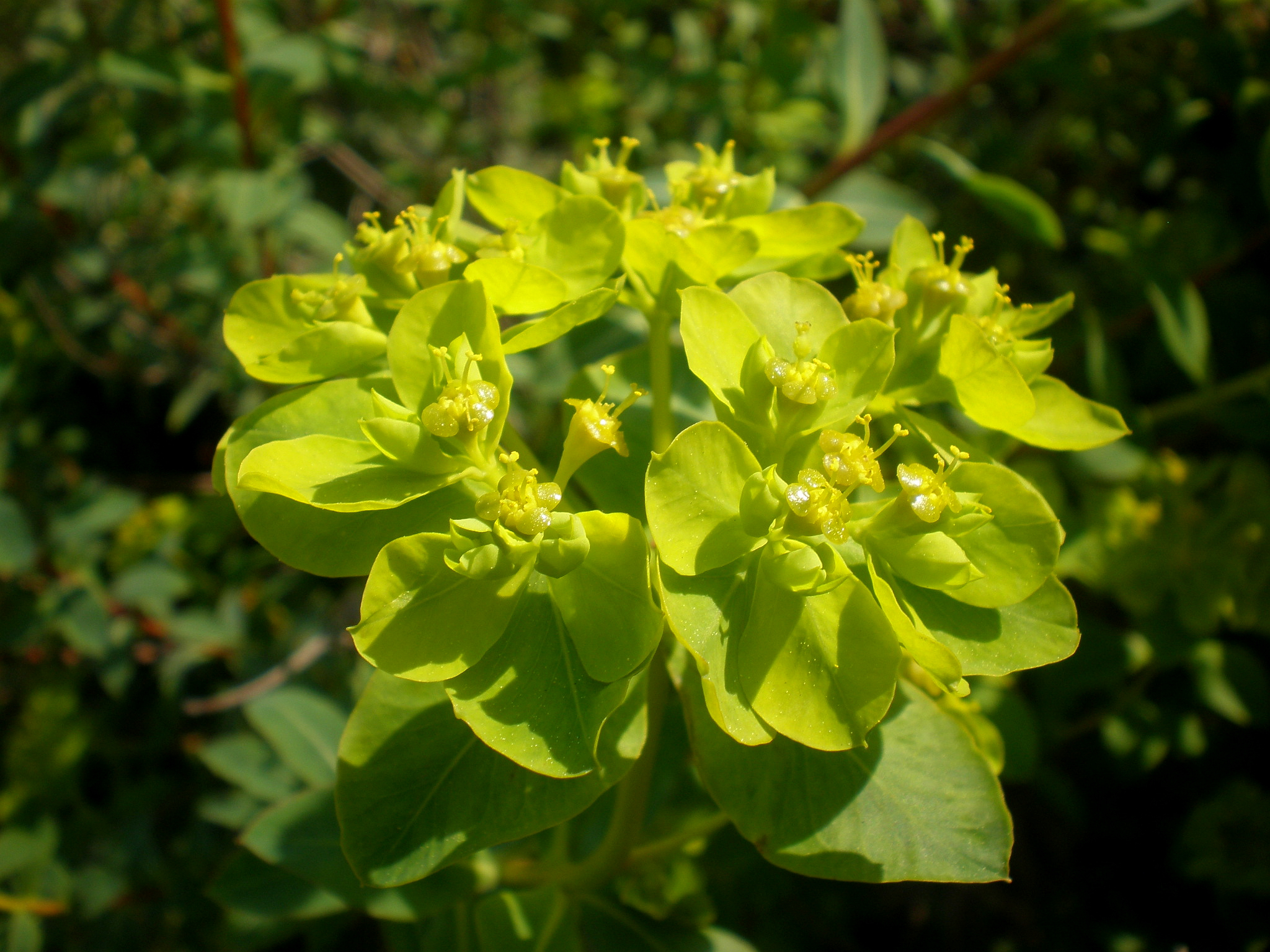
- At Botanical garden of Barcelona

Scientific classification
- Kingdom: Plantae
- Clade: Tracheophytes
- Clade: Angiosperms
- Clade: Eudicots
- Clade: Rosids
- Order: Malpighiales
- Family: Euphorbiaceae
- Genus: Euphorbia
- Species: E. hierosolymitana

Binomial name
- Euphorbia hierosolymitana Boiss.

= Euphorbia hierosolymitana =

Species of shrub

Euphorbia hierosolymitana is a shrubby plant species with two varieties.

== Description ==
A spineless hairless shrub, sometimes to 3m, often rather densely-stemmed (the stems little-branched), but may be more open and tree-like, the yellow ray leaves making the whole plant look rather yellow when in flower. Its leaves are untoothed, flower glands rounded (unhorned), fruit 5mm very warty, and seeds smooth. (See Illustration, iNaturalist Photos).

== Range ==
Natural to East Aegean Is., Egypt, Lebanon-Syria, Israel, areas of the Palestine Authority, Sinai, Transcaucasus, Turkey.

== Habitat ==
Turkey: Limestone rocks and cliffs, open forest, 5-300 m.

== Taxonomy ==
Euphorbia hierosolymitana contains the following varieties:

- Euphorbia hierosolymitana var. hierosolymitana (native to East Aegean Is., Egypt, Lebanon-Syria, Sinai, Transcaucasus, Turkey (PoWo))
- Euphorbia hierosolymitana var. ramanensis (Baum) Zohary (native to Palestine, Sinai (PoWo))
