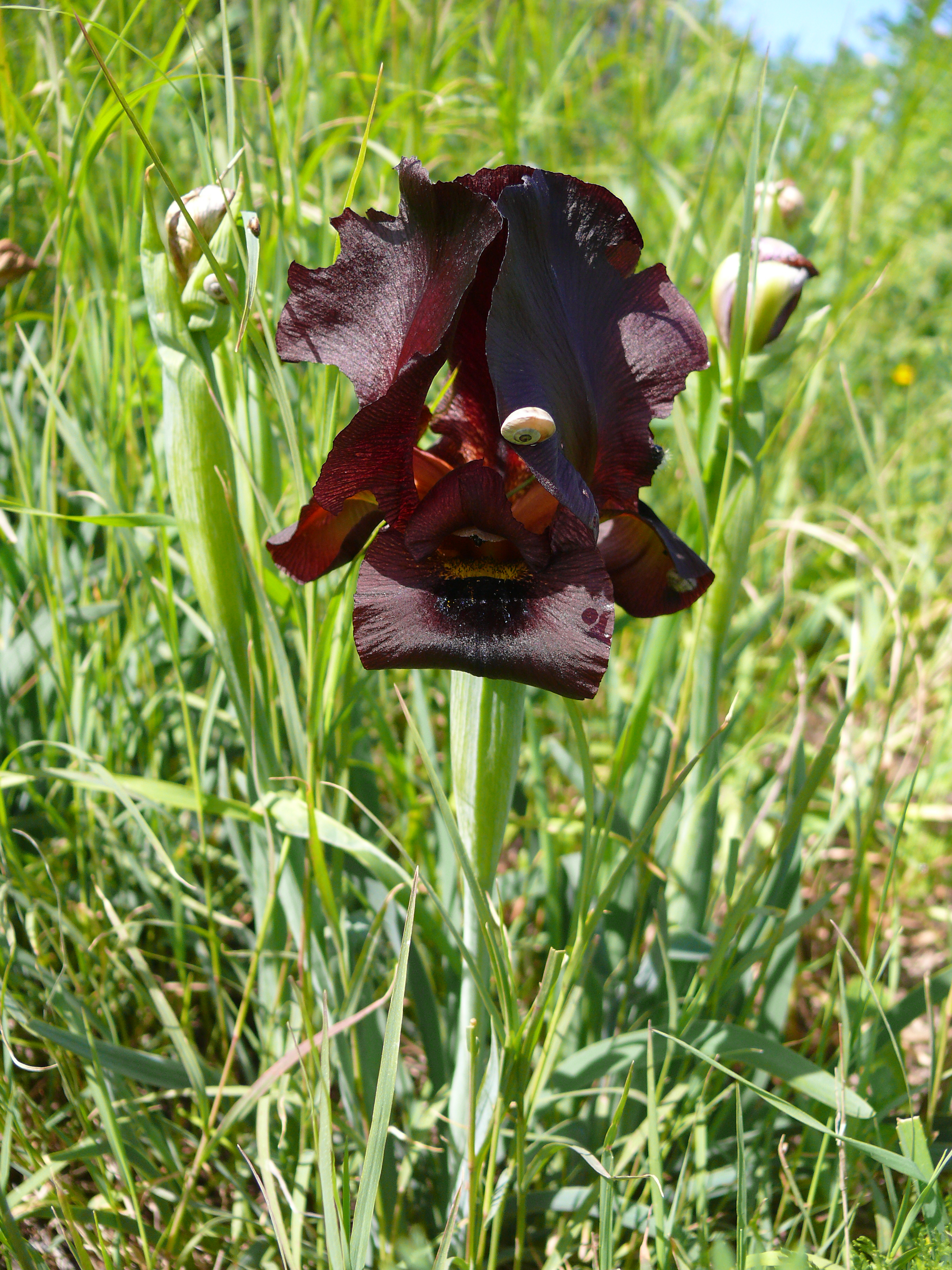

Conservation status
- Critically Endangered (IUCN 3.1)

Scientific classification
- Kingdom: Plantae
- Clade: Tracheophytes
- Clade: Angiosperms
- Clade: Monocots
- Order: Asparagales
- Family: Iridaceae
- Genus: Iris
- Subgenus: Iris subg. Iris
- Section: Iris sect. Oncocyclus
- Species: I. atropurpurea

Binomial name
- Iris atropurpurea Baker

Synonyms
- None

= Iris atropurpurea =

Species of flowering plant

Iris atropurpurea, the coastal iris (Hebrew: אירוס הארגמן, Irus HaArgaman, meaning "Purple Iris"; Arabic: سوسن أرجواني داكن, Sawsan argwānī al-dākin) is a species in the genus Iris, it is also in the subgenus of Iris and in the section Oncocyclus. It is a rhizomatous perennial, from Israel-Palestine. It has glaucous (blue-green), linear, falcate (sickle-shaped) leaves. Between February and March, it has between 1 and 2 flowers, in dark shades from red-brown, burgundy, dark purple to blackish purple. They have a darker signal patch and yellow beard tipped with purple. It is rarely cultivated as an ornamental plant in temperate regions, due to it needing very dry conditions.

== Description ==
It is a geophyte, with stout rhizomes, that are stoloniferous, forming long thin stolons, or secondary roots deep into the soil. The rhizomes are flush with the surface of the soil, so that they can feel the heat of the sun. They can form wide clumps of plants.

It has glaucous and linear leaves, that are falcate, The grass-like, leaves can grow up to between 6–11 cm (2–4 in) long, and between 0.5 and 0.8 cm wide. They are similar in form to Iris iberica (another Oncoyclus section iris).

It has a slender stem or peduncle, that can grow up to between 15–25 cm (6–10 in) tall.

The stem has green, lanceolate spathes (leaves of the flower bud), which are 7.6 cm long.

The stems hold between 1 and 2 terminal (top of stem) flowers, blooming early spring, between February and March. In the UK, it flowers in May, In cultivation, it flowers later, between April and May. Compared to Iris atrofusca and Iris hermona, it has floral longevity of (4.8 ± 1.3 days).

The flowers are 8 cm (3 in) in diameter, come in shades from orange, red-brown, dark burgundy, to purple, dark purple, or blackish purple. The flower's buds are usually black.

Like other irises, it has 2 pairs of petals, 3 large sepals (outer petals), known as the 'falls' and 3 inner, smaller petals (or tepals), known as the 'standards'. The narrow, falls are oblong shaped, and measure 3.6–6 cm (1–2 in) long and 2.5–4 cm wide. They are usually a darker shade of colour than the standards. They do not have veining, due to the dark colour of the petals, but they do have a blackish, or darker signal patch, and in the middle of the falls, a row of short hairs called the 'beard', which are yellow, with purple tips. The rounded standards, are incurved, paler than the falls and measure 5–5.8 cm (2–2 in) long and 4.5–6 cm wide. They also do not have veining, due to the shade of the petal.

It has style branch that is 3.5 cm long, with ovate crests. It has a green perianth tube, which is longer than the ovary. The flowers do not produce nectar, a reward (for insects who pollinate the plants).

After the iris has flowered, it produces a seed capsule, which has not been described.

=== Genetics ===
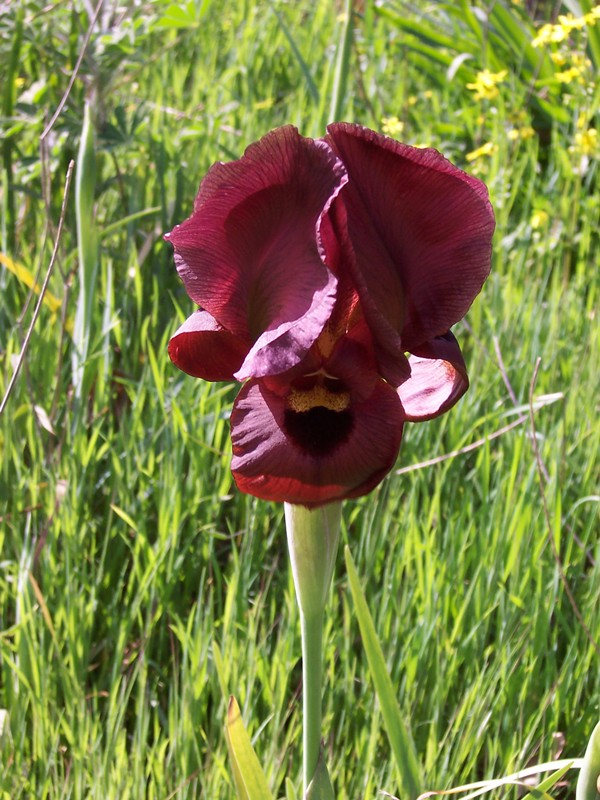

As most irises are diploid, (having two sets of chromosomes), this can be used to identify hybrids and classification of groupings. It was counted by Simonet, then by Randolph & Mitra in 1958, and also by Avishai & Zohary in 1980. It has a chromosome count: 2n=20.

In 2016, the phylogentic relationship of the 'Oncocyclus Section' was studied. It is suggested that the Caucasus area is the ancestral origin area.

== Taxonomy ==
It is also commonly known as "Coastal Iris". It is known as السوسن، آحيلة الكلب in Arabic, or Saoosan al-Sahel, and אִירוּס הָאַרְגָּמן in Hebrew, or Irus haArgaman, where argaman is Hebrew for "purple". It is also known as Negev-Iris in Swedish.

The Latin specific epithet atropurpurea means dark purple coloured.

It was first discovered in Syria, but there is doubt about the proper identification of the plant described as Iris atropurpurea at the time. Some dark forms of Iris pumila and Iris germanica were mistaken called Iris atropurpurea. and then first published and described by John Gilbert Baker in Gardeners' Chronicle (Gard. Chron.) Series 1, on page 330 on 16 March 1889. It was later also published by Foster in 'The Garden' on page 133 on 18 February 1893.

It is listed in the Encyclopedia of Life, and I. atropurpurea is an accepted name by the RHS.

== Distribution and habitat ==
It is native to the coastal plain of israel

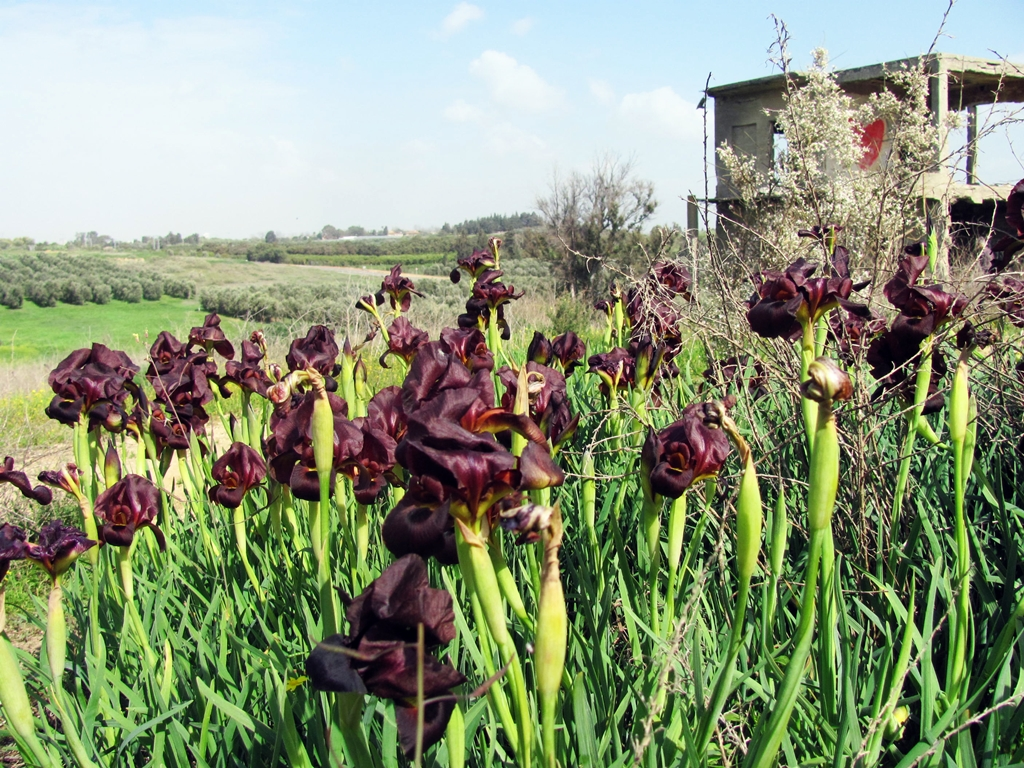

In Israel, where the plant is native, Iris atropurpurea is found along the Israeli coastal plain, including the Sharon Plain and Philistean Plain. It is found in the Ilanot Kadima Nature Reserve, a botanical forest garden in the Sharon region, and near the Rishon LeZion Shafdan dunes.

=== Habitat ===
It grows on poor quality sandy soils, or mixed with gravel, such as found in old sand dunes (or Kurkar Hills,) and along the coastal plains.

The iris and Iris hermona (another Oncocyclus section iris) are found on lime-less soils (light or basalt).

==== Synecology ====
The species is normally found with, heliotrope (heliotropium rotundifolium), a figwort (scrophularia xanthoglossa) scabious (scabiosa argentea) and a number of grasses.

== Conservation ==
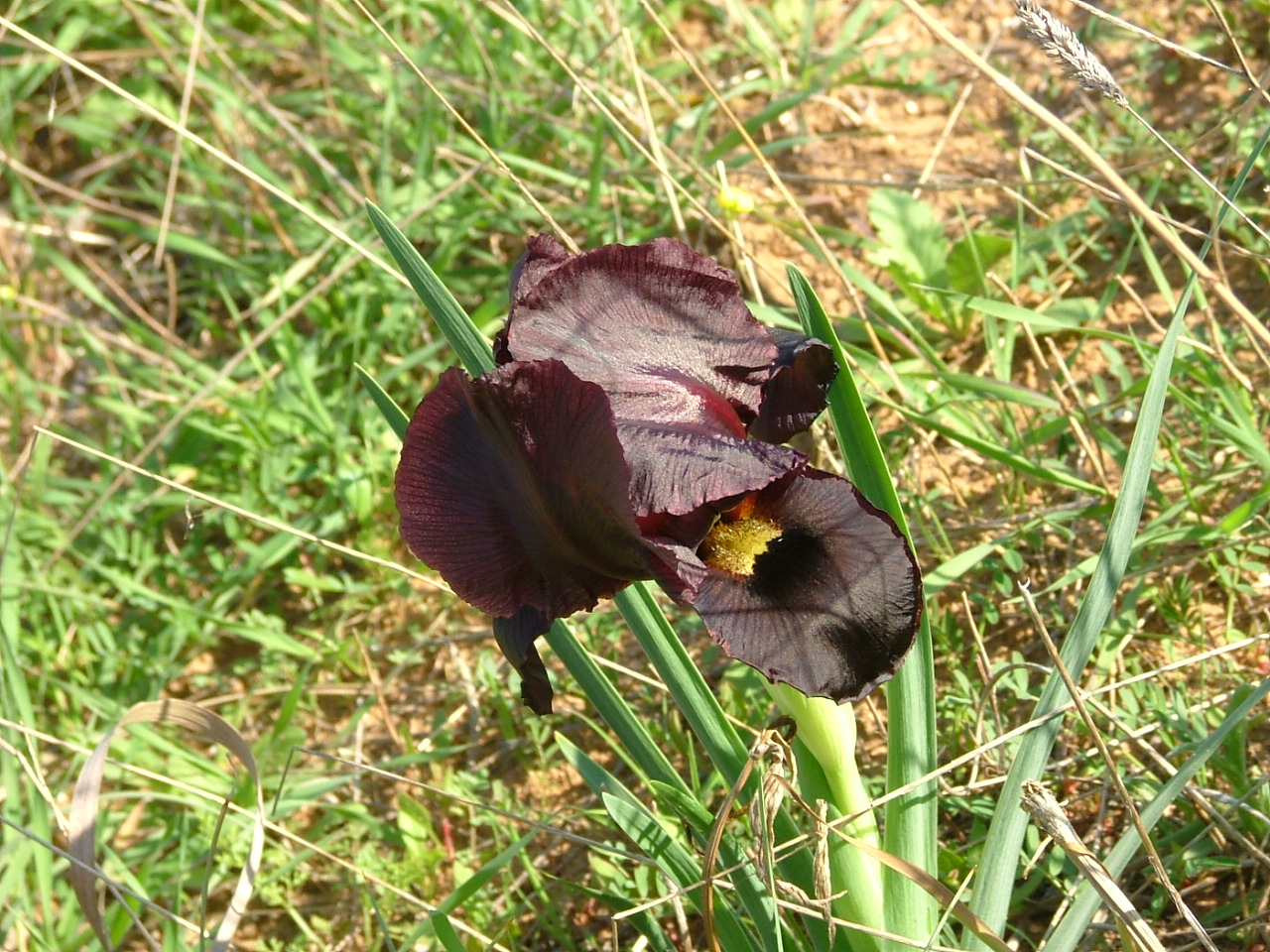

Previously, the iris was widely found along the coast of Israel, but by the 1950s, the habitats of I. atropurpurea was drastically affected by citrus plantations, and urbanisation, which reduced the fragmented areas of light soils along the coast. Then by 1959, it was listed as threatened by extinction, as only a few populations of the iris were found in reduced areas. In 1964, a law was established in Israel to protect the ten species of iris endemic to the region. Then in 1963, the Nature Reserves acts was established, which was followed by the establishment of the Nature Reserves Authority (NRA) in 1964, the authority enforces the act and manages the nature reserves. In 1975, Agami and Dafni, listed the iris as 'threatened by real extinction'. Later in 1986, 9 species of iris (including I. atropurpurea) were recorded in Flora Palaestina by Feinbrun. In 2000, ten species of iris, were classed as 'endangered' (according to IUCN categories). A new protection law was established on 1 February 2001. Then in 2008, it was listed by Smida and Polak, in the Red Data Book (the Rare and Endangered Plants of Israel.) as 'vulnerable', it was listed in 2012 as high conservation priority.

The iris is currently only found in nature reserves, such as the 'Irises Dora Rainpool nature park' near Netanya, which has the world's largest population of I. atropurpurea.

In 2009, the Israel Supreme Court upheld a plan to build an apartment complex near a seasonal lake which had a large population of the iris. Also in 2009, the Supreme Court denied an application to build houses on Ness Ziona's famous Iris Hill. The Society for Protection of Nature in Israel (SPNI) then appealed to the Israel Land Administration and the Ness Ziona Municipality, to have the Iris Hill officially declared a national park.

Populations of the iris, also can be found in 'Poleg nature reserve' (near Netanya), in the Beit Netufa Valley (which has 60 species of unique plants in danger of extinction).

== Cultivation ==
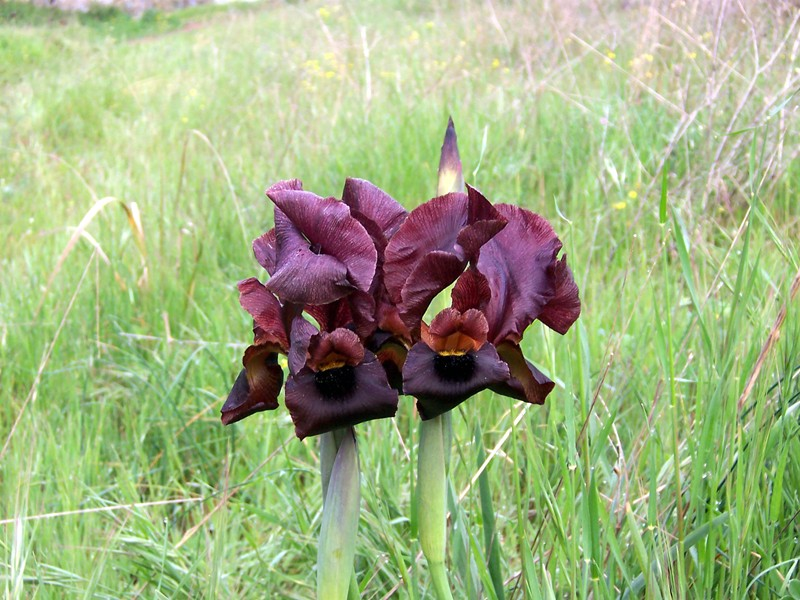
Iris atropurpurea in Kadima nature reserve, near Netanya

It is hardy to a dry Mediterranean-like climate, although within the UK, and some parts of the US, it is recommended to be grown in pots in a frost-free greenhouse with forced ventilation. They also prefer very fertile seed compost and dislike any temperature changes.

According to Dykes, it is best planted in October in the UK.

It has been cultivated in Syria.

=== Propagation ===
Irises can generally be propagated by division, or by seed growing. Irises seeds generally require a period of cold, then a period of warmth and heat, also they need some moisture. Some seeds need stratification, (the cold treatment), which can be carried out indoors or outdoors. Seedlings are generally potted on (or transplanted) when they have 3 leaves.

Mature clumps of plants can be divided every three years, and they need to be re-planted in September, when humidity is lowering and temperatures are milder. The rhizomes can be prone to bacterial rot, if conditions are too damp.

In the wild, the iris is pollinated by male eucerine bees (night-sheltering male bees,) and occasionally by female solitary bees.

The problem is that its populations have become so fragmented, with no natural flight path for bees between them, that they are now becoming reliant on man, who pollinates them instead, to maintain the genetic variability in the species.

The effects of inbreeding, due to the scattered populations of the iris have been studied.

=== Hybrids and cultivars ===
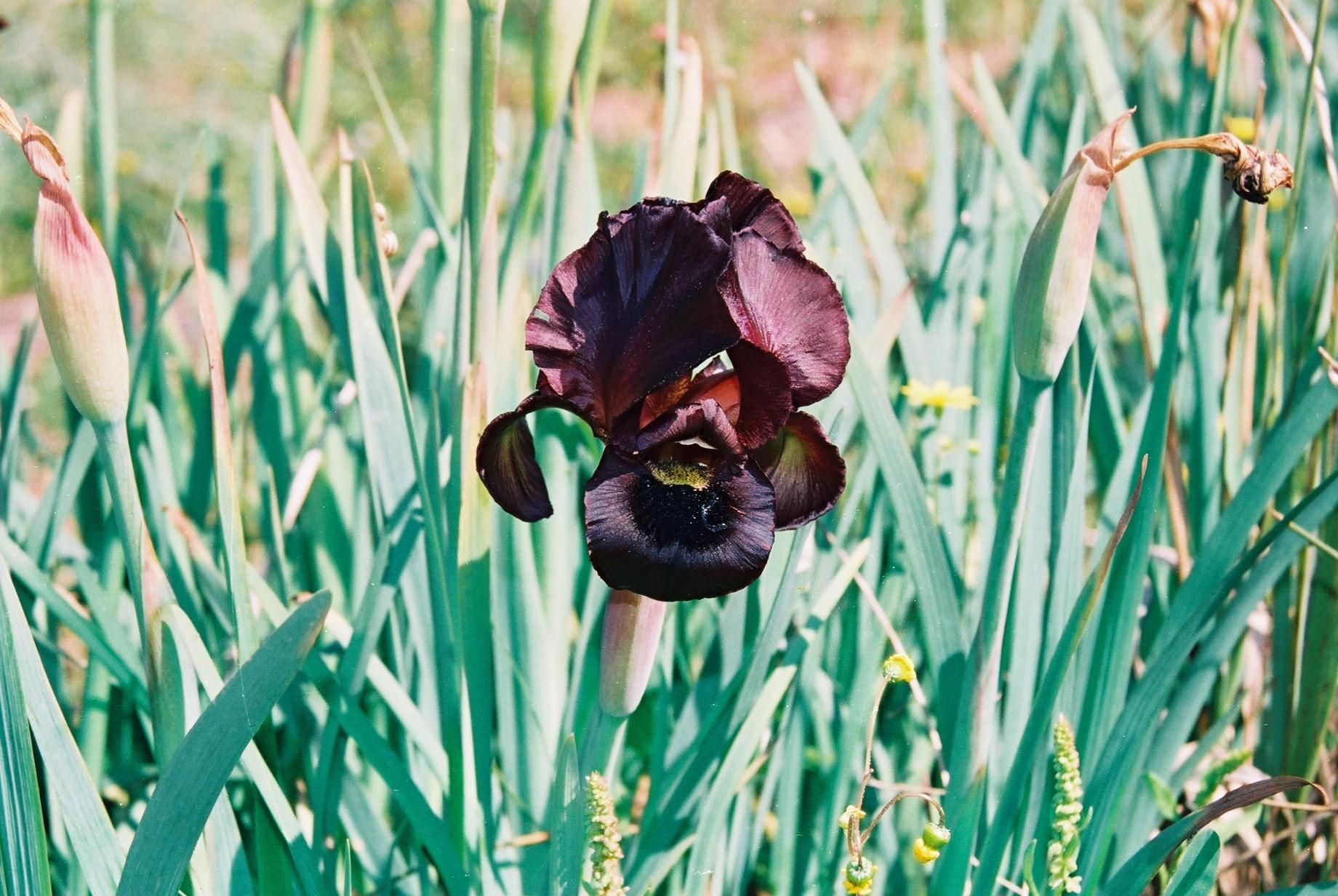

It was original introduced by Mesers Dammmann and Co. (a bulb nursery), who also sold a named variety 'Odysseus'. Several other cultivars have been bred, such as 'Atropurpurea Eggeri' and 'Rachel'.

I. atropurpuera has also hybridized with 'Section Regalia' irises Iris hoogiana and Iris korolkowii.

== Toxicity ==
Like many other irises, most parts of the plant are poisonous (rhizome and leaves), and if mistakenly ingested can cause stomach pains and vomiting. Also, handling the plant may cause skin irritation or an allergic reaction.

== Other sources ==
- Al-Khalil S, Al-Eisawi D. The chemotaxonomic profile of Iris atrofusca and Iris atropurpurea Bull. Fac. Pharm. (Cairo Uni.) 1995 33 (special issue) 111-4
- Aldén, B., S. Ryman & M. Hjertson Våra kulturväxters namn – ursprung och användning. Formas, Stockholm (Handbook on Swedish cultivated and utility plants, their names and origin). 2009 (Vara kulturvaxt namn)
- Mathew, B. The Iris. 1981 (Iris) 44.
- Sapir, Y. et al. 2002. Morphological variation of the Oncocyclus irises (Iris: Iridaceae) in the southern Levant Bot. J. Linn. Soc. 139:369–382.
- Zohary, M. & N. Feinbrun-Dothan Flora palaestina. 1966– (F Palest)
