= Iris nectarifera =

Scientific classification
- Kingdom: Plantae
- Clade: Tracheophytes
- Clade: Angiosperms
- Clade: Monocots
- Order: Asparagales
- Family: Iridaceae
- Genus: Iris
- Species: I. nectarifera

Binomial name
- Iris nectarifera Güner

Species of plant

Iris nectarifera is a species in the genus Iris, it is also in the subgenus of Iris and in the Oncocyclus section. It is found in Iraq, Syria and southeastern Turkey. It has yellow or cream flowers which have purple veining, a purple signal patch and a yellow beard. It has a known variety from Turkey called I. nectarifera var. mardinensis.

== Description ==
I. nectarifera has a stout rhizome with long stolons.

It has 6-8 leaves which are 0.8–0.13 cm (0–0 in) wide and falcate (sickle-shaped).

Over all the plant can grow up to 25–53 cm (10–21 in) tall, with flowers blooming in April. They are 13–16 cm (5–6 in) in diameter and flushed purple on a white or yellowish base.

The flowers are similar in form to Iris sari (from Turkey) but Iris nectarifera has more characteristic stoloniferous roots and the flowers are also similar in form to Iris heylandiana from Northern Iraq.

Like other irises, the flowers have 2 pairs of petals, 3 large sepals (outer petals), known as the 'falls' and 3 inner, smaller petals (or tepals, known as the 'standards'. The standards are paler in colour than the falls. The standards are obovate shaped, slightly purple veined, 7–8.5 cm (3–3 in) long and 3.7–4.2 cm (1–2 in) wide. The falls are lanceolate or narrowly elliptic shaped, 6–7.5 cm (2–3 in) long and 2.3–2.5 cm (1–1 in) wide. They are heavily veined with brownish-maroon or deep purple signal patch, in the middle with a narrow strip of yellow hairs about 0.8 cm wide, (or beard). It has a nectary on each side of the base of the falls and 3.5–4.5 cm (1–2 in) long, style arms with erect to recurved lobes, The perianth tube is 2–4 cm (1–2 in) cm long.

It has a green bract (modified leaf) and bracteole which is 7–9.5 cm (3–4 in) long.

After the plant has flowered, it produces a fruit/seed capsule which is 4.5–6.5 cm (2–3 in) long, which is fusiform shaped and contains 0.7–1 cm (0–0 in) long seeds which are rugose (wrinkled) with a large aril (coating).

=== Biochemistry ===
As most irises are diploid, meaning having two sets of chromosomes. This can be used to identify hybrids and classification of groupings. It's chromosomes have not yet been counted.

== Taxonomy ==
I. nectarifera is known as 'Ballı kurtkulağı' in Turkish.

It was first published and described by Adil Güner in 'Notes Roy. Bot. Gard. Edinburgh' (Notes from the Royal Botanic Garden Edinburgh) Vol.38 on page 413 in 1980.

It is an RHS accepted name and was last-listed in the RHS Plant Finder in 2009.

There is a known variety called I. nectarifera var. mardinensis Guner which has thinner leaves than I. nectarifera var. nectarifera, which are 0.8-0.9 cm wide and it has a perianth tube which is 2.0-2.5 cm long. It was found in Turkey and also published and described by Guner in Notes Roy. Bot. Gard. Edinburgh 38(3): 413 (1980). The specific epithet mardinensis refers to the Turkish city of Mardin in Turkish Kurdistan.

== Distribution and habitat ==
It is native to temperate Western Asia.

=== Range ===
It is found in mainly in Turkey, but also in Syria and Iraq.

=== Habitat ===
It grows on terra rossa (soil) on the steppes.

== Cultivation ==
In cultivation, its growing requirement are similar to the nearby found Iris gatesii (from the mountains of Turkey and Iraq).

=== Propagation ===
Irises can generally be propagated by division, or by seed growing.

== Toxicity ==
Like many other irises, most parts of the plant are poisonous (rhizome and leaves), if mistakenly ingested, it can cause stomach pains and vomiting. Also handling the plant may cause a skin irritation or an allergic reaction.
