= Coleophora dipalliata =

Scientific classification
- Kingdom: Animalia
- Phylum: Arthropoda
- Class: Insecta
- Order: Lepidoptera
- Family: Coleophoridae
- Genus: Coleophora
- Species: C. dipalliata

Binomial name
- Coleophora dipalliata (Reznik, 1981)

Synonyms
- Multicoloria dipalliata Reznik, 1981

Species of moth

Coleophora dipalliata is a moth of the family Coleophoridae. It is found in Turkmenistan.

The larvae feed on Astragalus xiphidioides. They feed on the leaves of their host plant.
