= Coleophora berlandella =

Scientific classification
- Kingdom: Animalia
- Phylum: Arthropoda
- Class: Insecta
- Order: Lepidoptera
- Family: Coleophoridae
- Genus: Coleophora
- Species: C. berlandella

Binomial name
- Coleophora berlandella Toll, 1956

Species of moth

Coleophora berlandella is a moth of the family Coleophoridae. It is found in Spain, Libya, Algeria, Tunisia and Turkmenistan.

The larvae feed on the leaves of Astragalus species including, A. barrovianus, A. xiphidioides and A. stevenianus.
