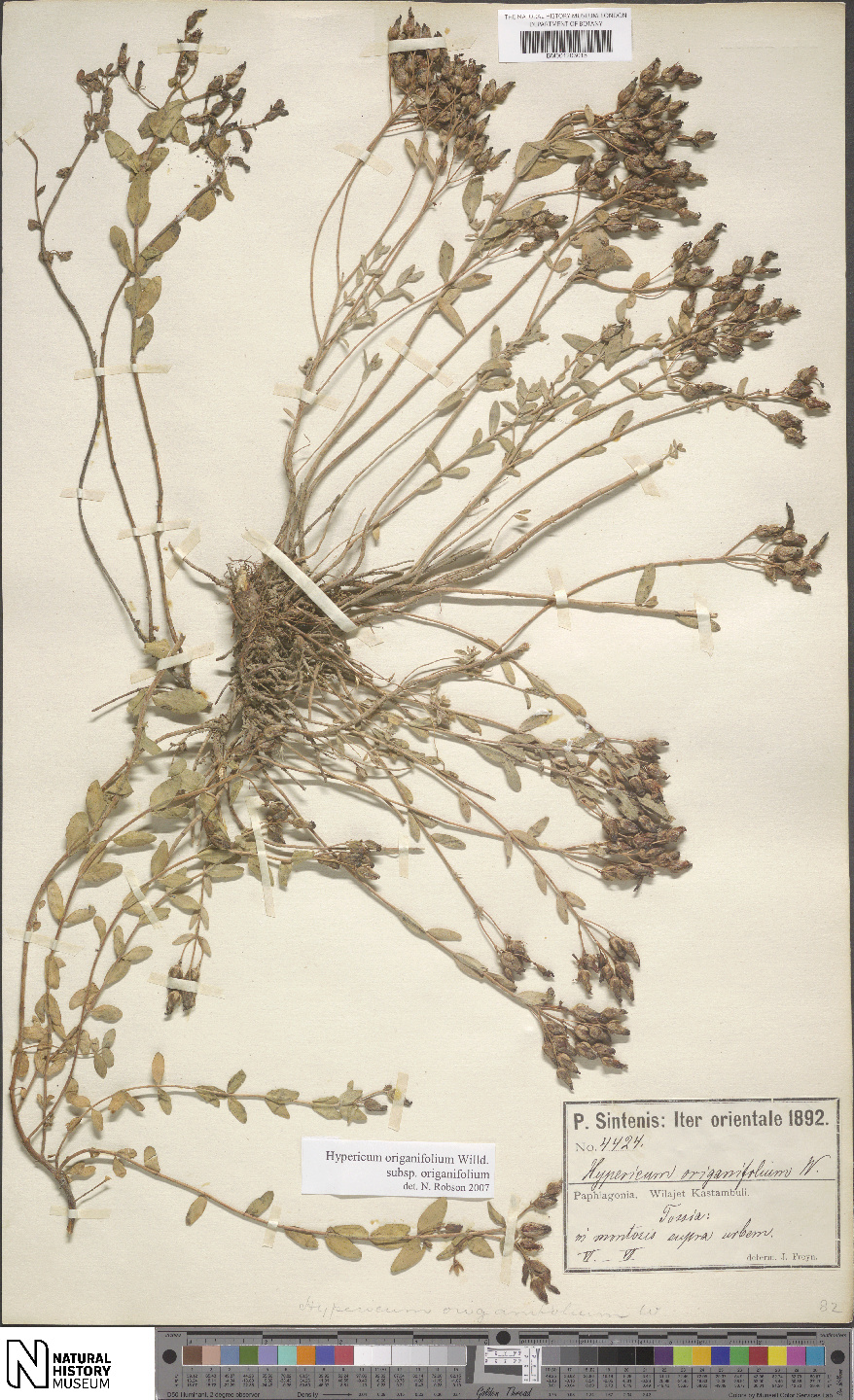

Scientific classification
- Kingdom: Plantae
- Clade: Tracheophytes
- Clade: Angiosperms
- Clade: Eudicots
- Clade: Rosids
- Order: Malpighiales
- Family: Hypericaceae
- Genus: Hypericum
- Subgenus: Hypericum subg. Hypericum
- Section: Hypericum sect. Origanifolia
- Species: H. origanifolium

Binomial name
- Hypericum origanifolium Willd.

= Hypericum origanifolium =

Species of flowering plant

Hypericum origanifolium is a species of flowering plant in the family Hypericaceae. It is native to Turkey, the Caucasus, and northwestern Syria. The species can be found in dry, often rocky, soil and on cliff slopes and ledges.

== Description ==
Hypericum origanifolium is a perennial herb that grows 5–30 centimeters tall. It has many stems that grow in dense clusters. They are dotted with black glands and covered in dense white hairs. The length of stem between leaves is 5–25 millimeters. The leaves are attached directly to the stems, and the blade measures 5–30 by 3–13 mm. They vary widely in shape, from a wide oval shape to a narrow lance-like shape. They have a papery texture, and are covered with the same kind of hairs as the stems. There are many pale glands and a few black glands on the leaves, which are point-shaped and irregularly spaced.

The inflorescence has 1–16 flowers which are each 15–28 mm wide. The petals are golden yellow and are a triangular lance shape. They are veined red and measure 9–15 by 4–7 mm. They have the same kind of glands as are on the leaves. Each flower has 23–36 stamens, the longest of which are 7–12 mm. The seeds are black-brown and 1.5–1.8 mm long.

== Taxonomy ==
Hypericum origanifolium was first formally described by Carl Ludwig Willdenow in 1803 in the fourth edition of Species Plantarum. A subspecies of Hypericum origanifolium was described in 1891 by Josef Freyn and Joseph Bornmüller. It is found only in Turkey and was named H. origanifolium subsp. depilatum. Norman Robson reduced the taxon to the level of variety in 2010, as part of his monograph of the genus Hypericum.

== Chemistry ==
Several phytochemicals have been found in Hypericum origanifolium; chlorogenic acid and rutin are the most common phenols found in the plant. Additionally, the species has a similar hypericin and flavonoid content to Hypericum perforatum, which indicates that it could serve as a substitute for the latter species.

In testing performed on mice, Hypericum origanifolium extracts demonstrated antidepressant, anxiolytic, and antinociceptive capabilities.
