= Khakiweed =

Khakiweed is a common name for several plants in the genus Alternanthera and may refer to:

- Alternanthera caracasana, native to Central and South America
- Alternanthera pungens
