= J. J. Manissadjian =

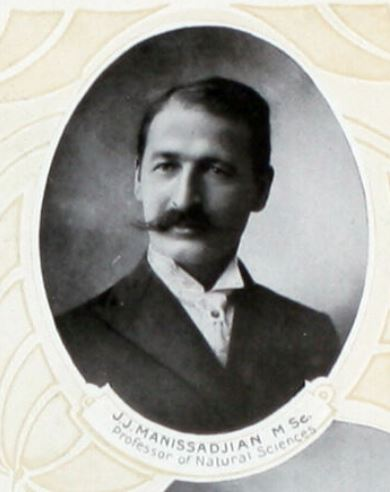
- Portrait of J. J. Manissadjian
- Born: 4 February 1862; Niksar, Ottoman Empire
- Died: 13 June 1942 (aged 80); Detroit, Michigan, United States of America
- Occupations: Schoolmaster and plant finder

Johannes (John) Jacob Manissadjian (Armenian: Յովհաննէս Յակոբ Մանիսաճեան, 1862–1942) was a botanist who lived in the Ottoman Empire. After the collapse of the Ottoman Empire, he emigrated to the United States.

== Life ==
Manissadjian mother, Katharina "Katherine" Margarete Barbara Klein, was German and his father, Barsam J Manissadjian, was Armenian. He studied natural history at the Humboldt University at Berlin. In 1890, he became Professor of Botany at the American Anatolia College in Marsovan (also spelled Mersiwan) in Paphlagonia in Northeastern Anatolia, where he founded a museum.

Manissadjian collected plants from the Southern Black Sea region, where he discovered several new species of bulbous plants that were later published by the Austrian Botanist Josef Franz Freyn.

In 1893, he wrote Lehrbücher des Seminars für Orientalische Sprachen zu Berlin Band 11: Mürsid-i lisan-y 'Osmani. Lehrbuch der modernen osmanischen Sprache, it has been reprinted many times. Manissadjian edited and distributed an exsiccata series with the title Plantae orientales.

By 1894, he had supplied commercial gardeners in the Netherland, foremost Van Tubergen, with plant material from the Pontus region. Among those were bulbs of the now locally extinct Sprenger's tulip from the Amasya region, and Allium tubergeni Freyn.

He sold other rare plants, for example Iris gatesii to Dutch commercial gardeners. Too many bulbs of Tulipa sprengeri were taken from the wild, and the plant became extinct.

The museum-library of Merzifon was constructed between 1910 and 1911.

Manissadjian survived the Armenian genocide (between 1915 and 1918) during the First World War, as his mother was German, but he was arrested in late June 1915, and was imprisoned by Ottoman forces.

Manissadjian and his family were released after American missionaries (from the college) bribed the local gendarmes. They were relocated to Amasya to an agricultural unit which was managed by Germans. In 1917, he was allowed to explore and started creating a collection of specimens for the college. It ranged from shells, corals, minerals, plants to mammals and birds. Manissadjian's collection was illustrated in the Catalogue of the Museum of Anatolia College which was handwritten by Manissadjian. It contained roughly 7,000 specimens.

In 1924, the college closed in Merzifon and reopened in Thessaloniki, Greece as Anatolia College. The college museum closed in 1939, and 130 of Manissadjian's plants went sent to the Herbarium of Ankara University, Faculty of Science.

Manissadjian was married to Arousyag Sara Eunice Daglian (1868–1948). He eventually fled to Detroit, USA, where he died in 1942.

== Species ==
Species named after Manissadjian include:

- Colchicum manissadjianii (Azn.) K.Perss.
- Iris manissadjiani Freyn, now a synonym of Iris sari
- Merenda manissadjiani

== Other sources ==
- Brian Mathew, Turhan Baytop 1984. The bulbous Plants of Turkey. London, Batsford, p. 12.
- Josef Franz Freyn 1894. Plantae novae Orientales. Österreichische botanische Zeitschrift, 324–327.
- A Portrait of Manissadjian was published in Brian Mathew, Turhan Baytop 1984. The bulbous Plants of Turkey. London, Batsford, Pl. 12.
