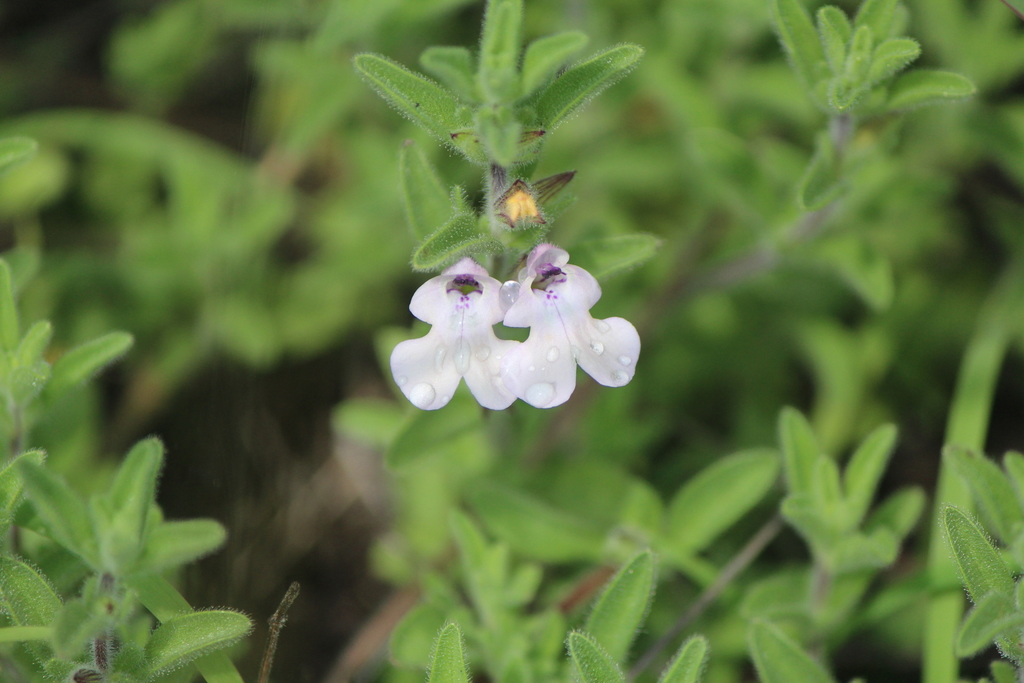

Scientific classification
- Kingdom: Plantae
- Clade: Tracheophytes
- Clade: Angiosperms
- Clade: Eudicots
- Clade: Asterids
- Order: Lamiales
- Family: Lamiaceae
- Genus: Salvia
- Species: S. axillaris

Binomial name
- Salvia axillaris Moc. & Sessé ex Benth.

Synonyms
- Salvia cuneifolia

= Salvia axillaris =

Species of flowering plant

Salvia axillaris is a perennial plant native to central Mexico from San Luis Potosí to Oaxaca. It is grown in horticulture as a ground cover, as it spreads on shoots that root at the nodes. It reaches about 1 m in height, with a great deal of variety in the leaves, depending on where it is growing. The flowers are small white tubes mostly hidden inside a small dark purple calyx, with the upper lip hooded and dark purple.
