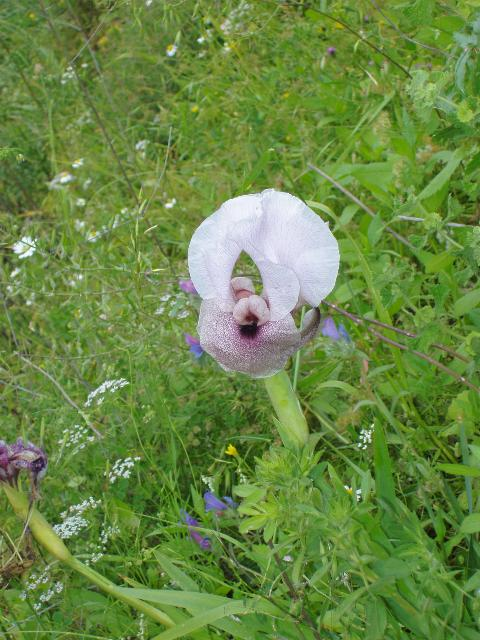

Conservation status
- Endangered (IUCN 3.1)

Scientific classification
- Kingdom: Plantae
- Clade: Embryophytes
- Clade: Tracheophytes
- Clade: Spermatophytes
- Clade: Angiosperms
- Clade: Monocots
- Order: Asparagales
- Family: Iridaceae
- Genus: Iris
- Subgenus: Iris subg. Iris
- Section: Iris sect. Oncocyclus
- Species: I. lortetii

Binomial name
- Iris lortetii Barbey ex Boiss.

Synonyms
- Iris lortetii var. lortetii

= Iris lortetii =

Species of plant

Iris lortetii (also known as Lortet's iris or in Israel as the Samarian iris) is a species in the genus Iris. It has straight grey-green leaves, a 30–50 cm tall stem, and large showy flowers in late spring or mid-summer that come in shades of pink, from white, lilac, pale lavender and grey-purple. It is veined and dotted pink or maroon. It has a signal patch that is deep maroon and a sparse and brown, purple-brown or reddish beard.

== Description ==
Iris lortetii is thought to resemble various other irises such as Iris sari, Iris gatesii, and Iris susiana, and has been called perhaps the most beautiful Iris in the world.

It has a short, stout rhizome, that is brown and fibrous. They grow just under the surface of the soil and form little complex networks.

It has grey-green leaves that are straight and sword-shaped. It can grow to between 18–23 cm (7–9 in) long, and 1–2 cm (0.39–0.79 in) wide. The leaves are larger than those of Iris susiana, (an iris in the same region) and they hide the flower stem. It is deciduous and disappears completely during the dormancy period in winter.

It has a flowering stem that is between 30–50 cm (12–19.5 in) tall.

It has spathes that are 5 and 6 in (12.5 and 15 cm) long with lanceolate and pale green valves.

It carries a solitary flower that blooms in late spring or mid-summer, between April and May.

The large flowers are 7–9 cm (3–3.5 in) in diameter. The very large showy flowers are variable in colour. They can come in shades of pink, from white, to lilac, pale lavender, and grey-purple.

Like other irises, it has 2 pairs of petals, 3 large sepals (outer petals) known as the 'falls', and 3 inner, smaller petals (or tepals, known as the 'standards'. The falls are oblong-obovate shaped and recurved (bent backwards), with maroon, brown, or crimson, lilac to pink dots and veins on a pale blue, lavender, pale cream or yellowish ground. It has a small deep maroon coloured signal patch, and in the middle of the falls, is a row of short hairs called the 'beard', which is sparse and brown, purple-brown or reddish in colour. The paler standards are orbicular shaped, with pale lilac veins on a nearly white ground.

It has a purplish-brown style with reddish brown lobes, and a 1.5 in (4 cm) long perianth tube.

After the iris has flowered, it produces a seed capsule, which is pollinated by ants, who also disperse the seeds.

=== Biochemistry ===
In 2006, it was found that the outer integument of I. lorteti and Iris confusa seeds contained a chemical compound, that was toxic to the germinated embryo. Blumentahal also found that the outer integument of I. lorteti and Iris confusa seeds contained a compound toxic to the germinated embryo. Also the iris seeds have a dormancy period of several months, this is due to mechanical resistance of the integument.

=== Genetics ===
As most irises are diploid, having two sets of chromosomes. This can be used to identify hybrids and classification of groupings. It has a chromosome count of 2n=20.

== Taxonomy ==
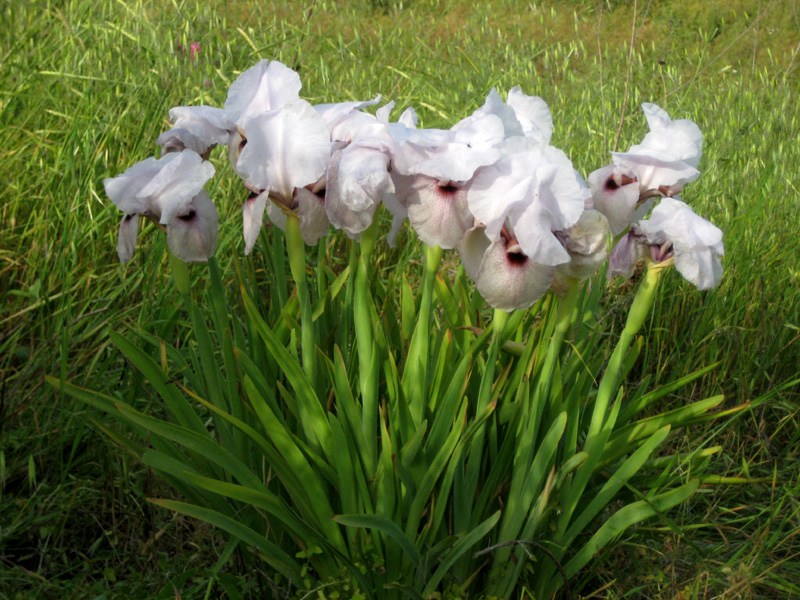
Iris lortetii

It is written in Hebrew: אִירוּס הָדוּר, and in Arabic: أللّغة آلعربيّة سوسن جميل.

It is commonly known as 'Lortet's Iris', and it also called 'Samarian Iris', although mainly in Israel.

The Latin specific epithet 'lortetii' is derived from Louis Charles Émile Lortet (1836–1909) who was a French physician, botanist, zoologist and Egyptologist, he had collected the iris from the Lebanese area of the Upper Galilee, during his travels to Syria in 1880.

William Barbey already described Iris lortetii but the name was validly published by Pierre Edmond Boissier in July 1882.

It is sometimes incorrectly spelled as Iris lorteti, missing an i at the end of the word.

I. lortetii is a tentatively accepted name by the RHS, and it is listed in the Encyclopedia of Life. It was verified by United States Department of Agriculture Agricultural Research Service on 4 April 2003, then updated on 1 December 2004.

Iris lortetii var. samariae (Dinsm.) Feinbrun is a known and accepted variant.

== Distribution and habitat ==
Iris lortetii is native to temperate Asia.

=== Range ===
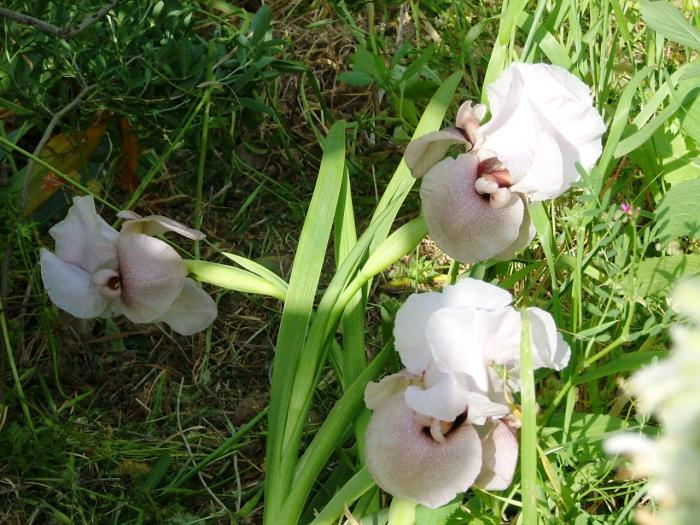

It is endemic to Israel, Palestine and southern Lebanon, (south of the Litani River) and in Syria.

In Israel, it is found in the regions of Upper Galilee, Mount Gilboa, Samarian mountains and Samarian desert.

=== Habitat ===
It grows on well drained, stony terra rossa, or rocky limestone slopes, with open shrubland and sometimes in rock crevices on limestone cliffs. It can also grow in pine forests, or Mediterranean woodlands and shrubland. It can be found at an altitude of 200–1,000 m (660–3,280 ft) above sea level.

== Conservation ==
Within Israel, Iris lortetii was considered in 2002 as Endangered.

The overall population size of the iris is estimated to be less than 10,000 mature individuals and the count is declining. Only four small populations are known at present. The Galilee populations, however, have been growing and expanding since the 1960s.

Of the endangered populations, the variety 'samaria' from the northern West Bank is particularly threatened by collection from the wild with the uprooting of its rhizomes for commercial use; at one time it had primarily been a cut flower, sold to customers from the roadside. Large quantities of this plant were collected in the course of the 19th century and then exported to Europe, but the cultivated specimens would die after two seasons of flowering. These short life spans mean that freshly collected rhizomes and plants have regularly been needed to supply the flower industry. The number of individual plants have therefore declined by approximately 10% over the last ten years, and sub-populations are likely to have been lost or become extinct.

Other population threats include rapid habitat destruction by afforestation. The rhizomes do not like being crowded or shaded and are difficult to grow with other plants, including those that block their sunlight. Iris populations can be threatened by Quercus calliprinos Webb (the Palestine oak) and Pinus halepensis Miller (the Aleppo pine). In some areas, grazing by herbivorous mammals has aided survival of the iris by reducing other nearby plants.

As the iris is protected by the nature conservation laws in Israel, several conservation measures have been proposed to ensure the survival of the remaining populations; these include establishment of an iris reserve and active pollination and reseeding.

As the Oncocyclus Irises are difficult to maintain in cultivation, much research has been carried out, especially at the Van Tubergen Nurseries in Haarlem, Netherlands. Keren Kayemet LeIsrael (KKL-JNF) carried out a study in 2012, about growing the iris from seed. Over 3,000 seeds were gathered from all the known indigenous populations, and then scientists sprouted them in greenhouse conditions with the goal of planting them in the wild later on, in the Tel Aviv University Botanical Garden. The mature plants will be planted at selected sites on KKL-JNF lands over the next three years of the study. Various thinning treatments will be carried out, in order to ensure sufficient quantities of light for healthy plants.

In the southern hills of Lebanon, the status of the populations of Iris westii and I. lortetii are not known; it has been too dangerous to investigate them due to the extensive placement of explosive mines during the Israeli occupation of Southern Lebanon between 1985 and 2000.

== Cultivation ==
I. lortetii is deemed to be one of the most difficult irises to cultivate in its class. It is hardy to European Zone H4, and USDA Zones 2 to 9.

It prefers positions in part shade to full sun, in slightly acidic soils (with a pH level between 5 and 7.5) that are a mix of sand and clay. Like many other irises, it should be kept moist while in growth but completely dry during dormancy (winter time), and high-nitrogen fertilizer should not be given to it.

In places where it is not hardy, the plant can be stored in the late summer and fall at 23 °C, which mimics the hot and dry climate of their natural Mediterranean habitat; however, the rhizomes will lose between 30 and 60% of their weight during storage.

The Aphid Dysaphis tulipae can be found on the plant.

=== Propagation ===
Irises can generally be propagated by division, or by seed growing.

It was found that the force required to break seed coat is 133.2 MPa (Blumenthal et al., 1986). Blumenthal et al. (1986) found different germination rates among species, from 1% to 60% seed germination in the first year for Iris lortetii Barbey and Iris atropurpurea. Also, the pressure needed to pierce the seed coat of the two species, I. lortetii and I. atropurpurea, was 135 and 77 atmospheres, respectively.

=== Hybrids and cultivars ===
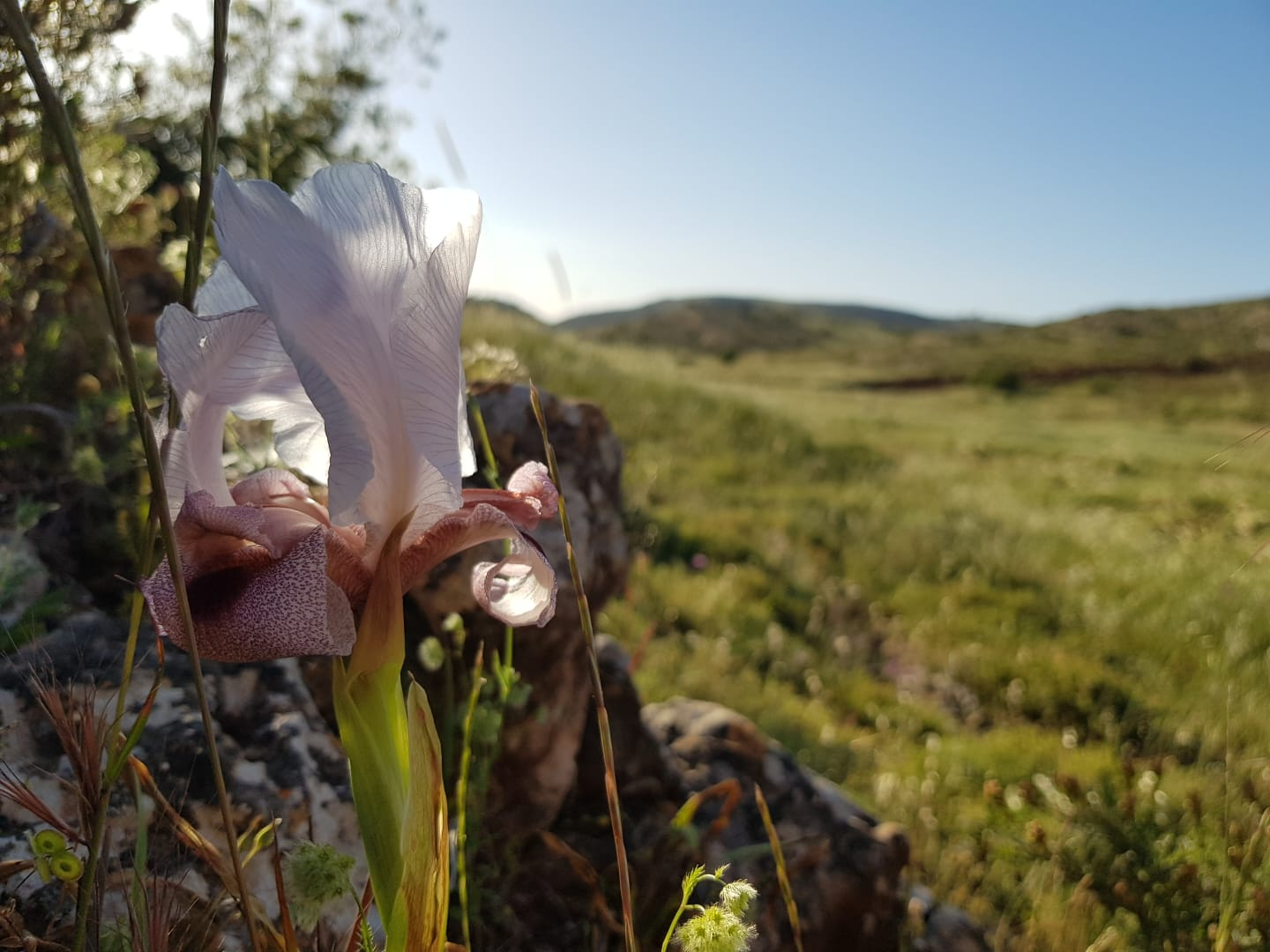
Iris lortetii var. samariae in Esh Kodesh, Israel

Iris lortetii var. samariae (Dinsm.) Feinbrun is a known variant. It was published in Fl. Palaestina 4: 121 in 1986. It has the synonym of Iris samariae Dinsm., and the common name of 'Samaria Iris', which is written in Hebrew: איריס הדור זן שומרוני. Its description differs from Iris lortetii in several ways, such as darker standards, with brownish to purple veins on a cream coloured ground, and it blooms in April. Its distribution range is found in Samaria around the city of Nablus (or Schekem) at about 800m above sea level.

There is one known cultivar Iris lortetii 'alba' which has pure white flowers.

== Toxicity ==
Like many other irises, most parts of the plant are poisonous (rhizome and leaves), if mistakenly ingested can cause stomach pains and vomiting. Also handling the plant may cause a skin irritation or an allergic reaction.

== Uses ==
Soon after it was discovered in 1882, a lot of rhizomes were taken for commercial cultivation in Israel. They were exported to Europe for the ornamental plant trade. Unfortunately, the cultivated specimens rarely survived more than 2 seasons, causing a continuous demand for fresh plants and rhizomes. It was also collected extensively for the cut flower industry and was sold in bunches on the side of the road, plants were also moved to decorate the cemeteries in the area. It is still available locally, in Upper Galilee, Israel for sale as garden plants.

== Culture ==
An illustration of Iris lortetii has been used in 1978, as an Israeli postage stamp, part of 'Protect Wild Flowers' series.
