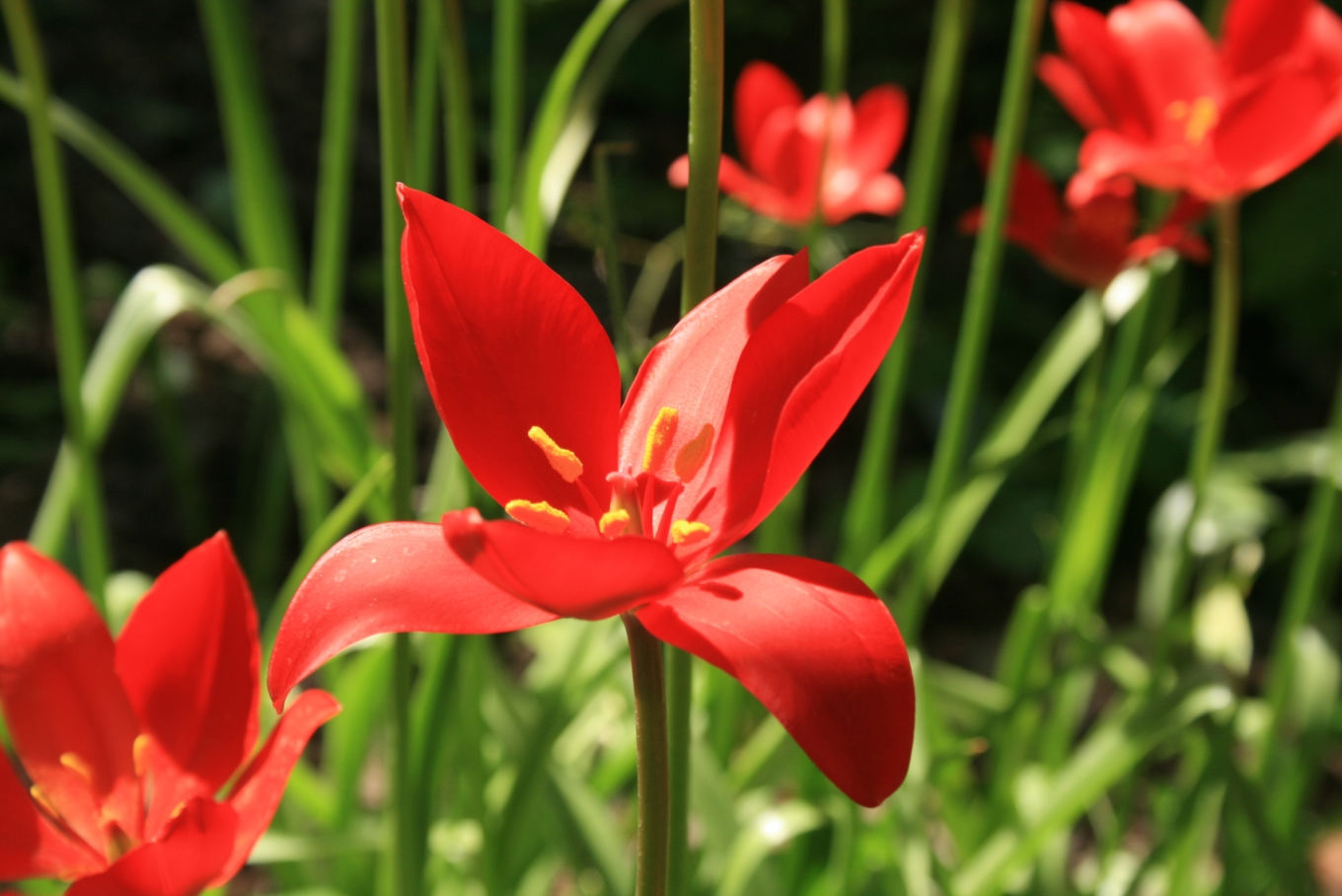

Scientific classification
- Kingdom: Plantae
- Clade: Embryophytes
- Clade: Tracheophytes
- Clade: Spermatophytes
- Clade: Angiosperms
- Clade: Monocots
- Order: Liliales
- Family: Liliaceae
- Subfamily: Lilioideae
- Genus: Tulipa
- Subgenus: Tulipa subg. Eriostemones
- Species: T. sprengeri

Binomial name
- Tulipa sprengeri Baker
- It is endemic to Amasya, Turkey

Synonyms
- Tulipa brachyanthera Freyn

= Tulipa sprengeri =

Species of flowering plant

Tulipa sprengeri, the Sprenger's tulip, is a species of perennial, bulbous plant in the family Liliaceae endemic to Amasya, Turkey. It was long considered extinct in the wild, but was rediscovered in June 2026 by Ercan Eftelioglu after 130 years in a rural area of Amasya, Turkey. It is cultivated as an ornamental plant.

== Description ==
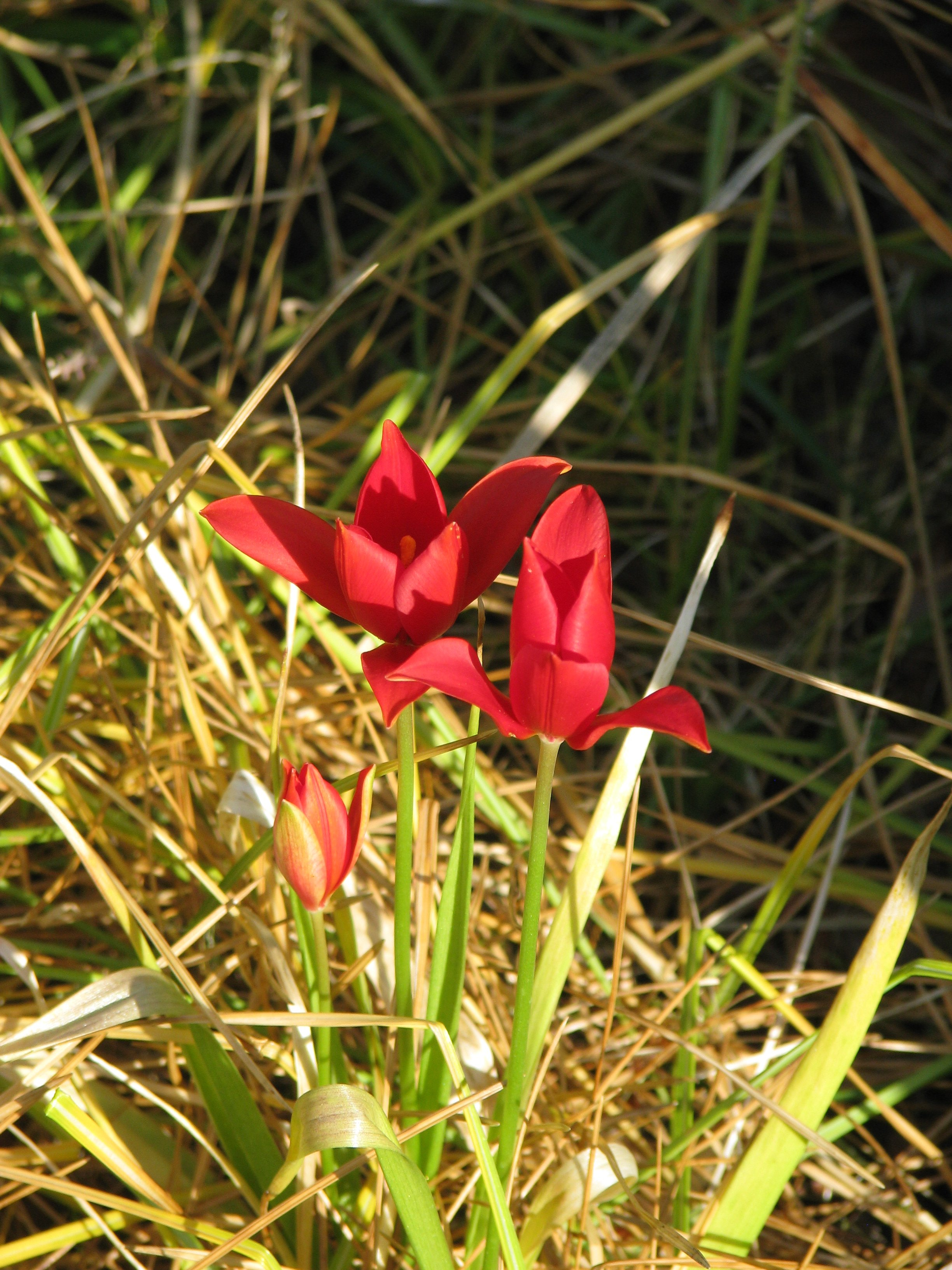
Sprenger's tulip

=== Vegetative characteristics ===
Tulipa sprengeri is a 30–40(–50) cm tall, perennial, bulbous plant with small, ovoid, 3–4 cm long bulbs bearing brown, papery, glabrous or adaxially slightly pubescent tunics. The 4–6 glabrous, lanceolate, shiny green leaves are channelled. The lower leaves are 29–35 cm long, and 2.3–3.2 cm wide and the upper leaves are 22–34 cm long, and 1.1–2.1 cm wide.

=== Generative characteristics ===
The solitary flower, held on a 18–29 cm long, and 0.4–0.5 cm wide, erect, glabrous peduncle, have upright and bright green buds. The bright red perianth without a basal blotch is campanulate. The obovate tepals are long and pointed, the oblong-elliptic outer tepals slightly shorter and light brown or yellowish on the outside, sometimes there is a green seam along the midrib, widening towards the tip. They are very narrow on the base, often leaving a gap. The flower itself is funnel-, later star-shaped. The filaments are glabrous, bright red at the top, pale yellow at base, 19–22 mm long, ca. 1 mm wide at tip, the swollen base is 3–4 mm wide. The anthers are yellow. The cylindrical, green ovary bears a small stigma.

=== Cytology ===
It is diploid.

== Taxonomy ==
It was first described by J. Gilbert Baker in 1894 in The Gardeners' Chronicle. The type specimen was collected in 1892 by the German gardener Mühlendorff in Amasya, Turkey. The plant was introduced to Europe by the German gardener Mühlendorff in 1892, who discovered it near Amasya. It is named after Carl Sprenger, a commercial gardener, who also published a description of the plant. Mühlendorff sent bulbs to the nursery of Damman&Cie near Naples in Italy, which then supplied numerous bulbs to European gardeners between 1895 and 1898. The Armenian teacher J. J. Manissadijan from Merzifon supplied bulbs to the Dutch company Van Tubergen and John Hoog. Too many bulbs were taken from the wild, and the plant was believed to have become extinct. The Englishman Edward Whittall from İzmir seems to have supplied Damman & Sprenger as well.

Although it had been previously placed in the subgenus Tulipa subg. Tulipa based on morphology, it is now placed in the subgenus Tulipa subg. Eriostemones based on genetic analyses.

== Distribution and habitat ==
There are no descriptions of the wild habitat of the plant.

== Conservation ==
It was long considered extinct in the wild, but it has been rediscovered in June 2026. Sprenger's tulip is grown in over 30 Botanical gardens, among them Kew, Kopenhagen, Bonn and Edinburgh, it is also widely available from commercial nurseries.

The Atatürk Arboretum in Istanbul has initiated a reintroduction project in co-operation with Kew Gardens. Genetic studies have shown that the tulips grown at Kew have retained a relatively wide genetic diversity. The story of the single misplaced bulb supplied by J. J. "Manissaadjian" to Van Tubergen therefore seems spurious.

== Cultivation ==
Sprenger's tulip is easy to grow. It can be naturalised. It also successfully self-seeds, the seeds need to be stratified. The plant needs only four years till flowering-stage. The plant needs a sunny but not too hot or semi-shady position. It should be planted 10–15 cm deep in well-drained, fairly fertile, humus-rich but not too dry soil. It may need protection from strong winds, but is frosthardy to - 10 °C, as long as the soil is not waterlogged or excessively wet. The plant tends to root very deeply. It received the RHS Award of Garden Merit in 1948 and 1993.

It rarely hybridizes because of the late flowering time. The bulbs dislike being disturbed and are difficult to move. The plant is susceptible to aphids.
