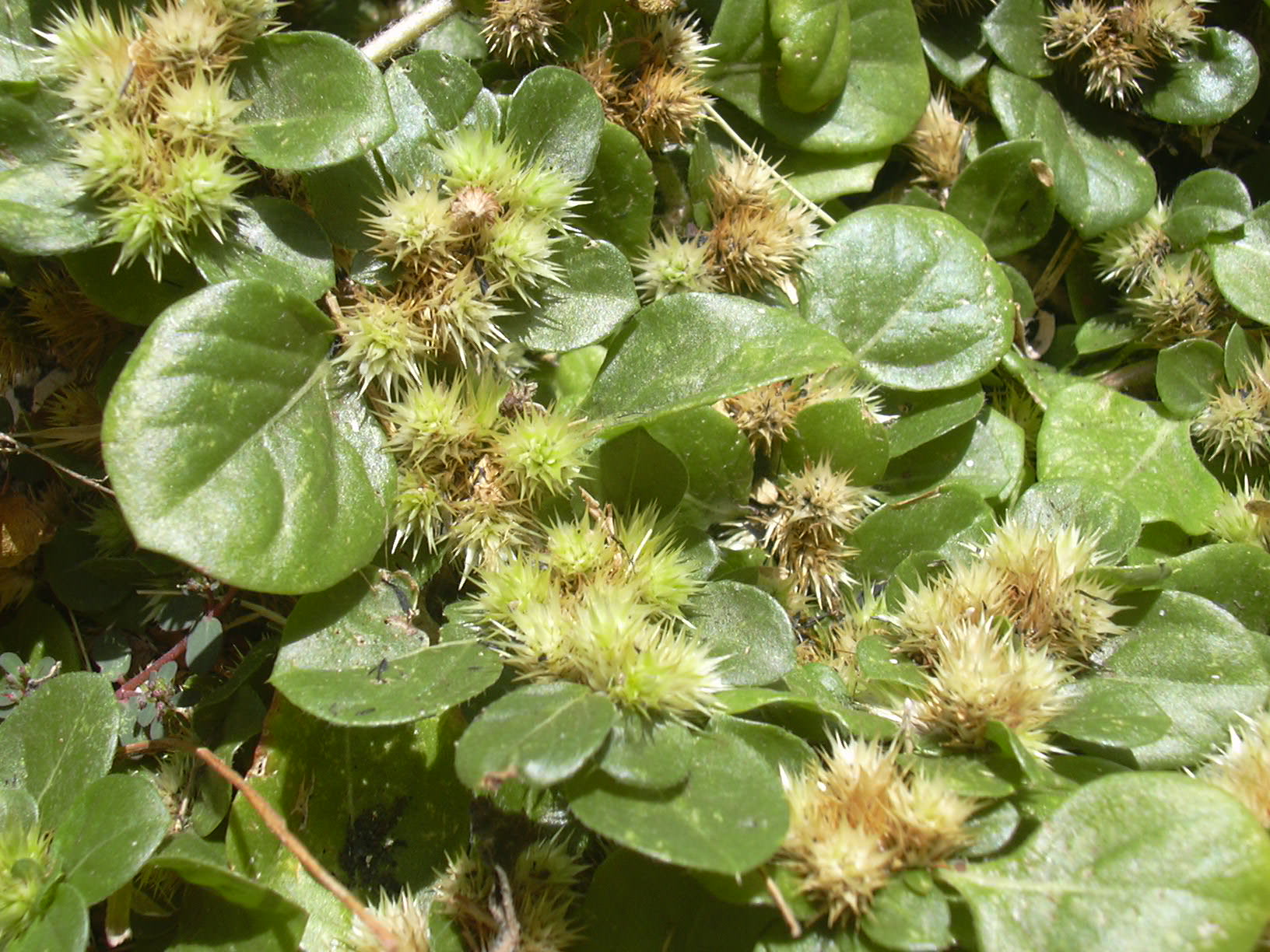

Scientific classification
- Kingdom: Plantae
- Clade: Tracheophytes
- Clade: Angiosperms
- Clade: Eudicots
- Order: Caryophyllales
- Family: Amaranthaceae
- Genus: Alternanthera
- Species: A. pungens

Binomial name
- Alternanthera pungens Kunth

Synonyms
- Alternanthera achyrantha R.Br. ex Sweet

= Alternanthera pungens =

Species of flowering plant

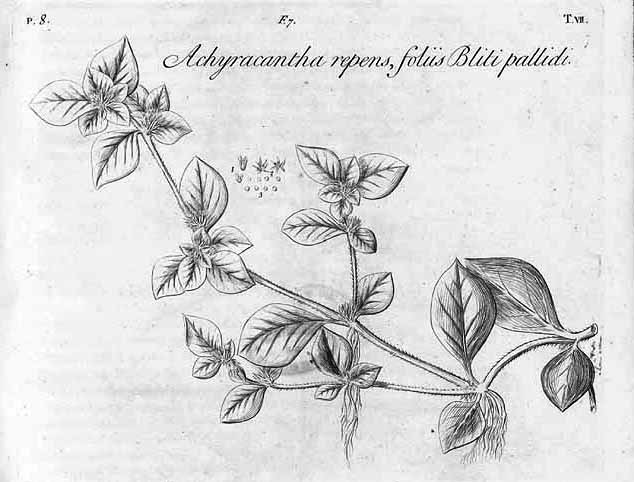
Illustration from Hortus Elthamensis

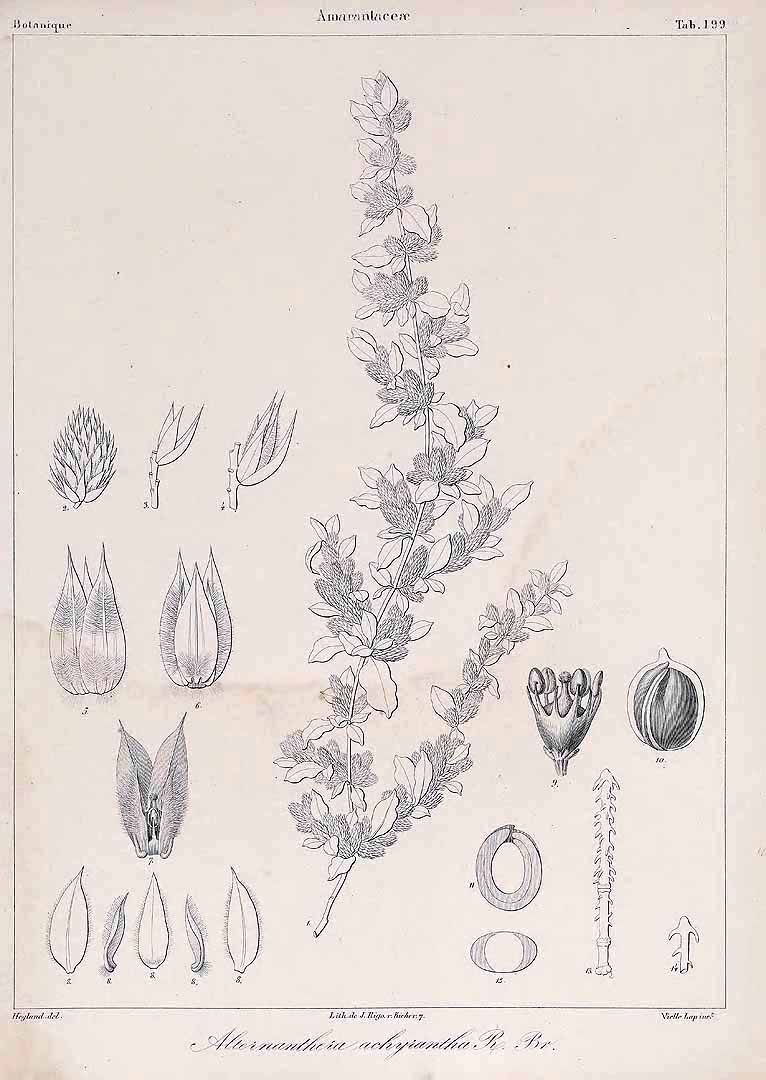
Illustration from Histoire naturelle des Iles Canaries

Alternanthera pungens is a creeping, prostrate perennial pioneer plant of the family Amaranthaceae, spreading by seed and vegetatively, with roots often developing at the nodes of spreading stems. A plant of roadsides, path verges and waste places (ruderal), it is thought to have come from Central and South America, and to have become widely established in Australia and Southern Africa. Other species of this genus, e.g. Alternanthera sessilis (L.) R.Br. ex DC., have long been recorded from Tropical Africa, and would be difficult to prove as invaders.

The species forms dense mats of stems and leaves during the rainy season. During the dry season or in drought, material above ground dies off and the dormant plant is sustained by its fleshy taproot. Clusters of small white flowers form in the leaf axils. The small, khaki-coloured, prickly, papery fruits are stemless, form in the leaf axils and are spread by stock, vehicles and in stock feed. The shiny seeds are brownish, compressed, lenticular and about 1.5 mm across.

The species was illustrated as far back as 1732 by Johann Jacob Dillenius in his Hortus Elthamensis, vol. 1, and described as "Achyracantha repens foliis Bliti pallidi", and again in 1836 by Jean-Christophe Heyland (1792-1866) in Histoire naturelle des Iles Canaries, vol. 2(3): p. 193, t. 199 (1836). Kew currently lists 139 species in the genus Alternanthera.

== Synonyms ==
- Alternanthera achyrantha R.Br. ex Sweet
