= José Mariano Mociño =

Mexican naturalist (1757–1820)

- Born: José Mariano Mociño Suárez Lozano; 24 September 1757; Temascaltepec, New Spain (now in the State of Mexico)
- Died: June 12, 1820 (aged 62); Barcelona, Spain
- Occupation: Botanist

José Mariano Mociño Suárez Lozano (24 September 1757 – 12 June 1820), or simply José Mariano Mociño, was a naturalist from Mexico.

After having studied philosophy and medicine, he conducted early research on the botany, geology, and anthropology of his country and other parts of North America.

== Biography ==
He was born in Temascaltepec (modern-day Mexico State) in 1757. Being poor, he worked in many different jobs to study in the Seminario Tridentino de México, where he devoted himself especially to physics, mathematics, botany, and chemistry. In 1778 he graduated in philosophy. In 1791 he was called to join the scientific expedition of Martín de Sessé, the Royal Botanical Expedition, which had started in 1787. They traveled across New Spain, reaching the most inhospitable places of the Empire, being especially notable his trips to the Pacific Northwest. Although the pay for his job was minimal, he created one of the most important natural history collections of his times.

Beginning in 1795, by order of Charles IV, he made several journeys to examine the natural products of Mexico. He traveled more than 3,000 leagues and formed a valuable collection, including a considerable herbarium and a great number of sketches, which he took to Spain in 1803. There Mociño was two times secretary and four times president of the Royal Medicine Academy of Madrid.

Mociño sympathised with Joseph Bonaparte, and when the French withdrew after the Peninsular War, he was taken prisoner, accused of afrancesado. Finally, he managed to flee to France. In 1816 in Montpellier he met the naturalist Augustin Pyramus de Candolle, to whom he showed the collections he could save, and entrusted to him the manuscripts for a Flora Mexicana.

Candolle brought him to Geneva, where he became professor in the University of Geneva. In 1818 he returned to Spain. He asked Candolle to return his manuscripts, which Candolle did after having the talented botanical illustrator, Jean-Christophe Heyland, make copies of the plates. The originals are deposited at the botanical garden of Madrid along with the manuscripts for a Flora de Guatemala. He died in Barcelona, poor and blind, in 1820.

He was one of the most famous American naturalists of the colonial period. Among his publications were Descripción del Volcan Jorullo en versos latinos (Mexico, 1801), and “Observaciones sobre la resina del hule,” published in the Anales de Ciencias Naturales (Madrid, 1804).

Pablo de la Llave named the resplendent quetzal Pharomachrus mocinno to honour his mentor Mociño, who was the first to classify the bird.
