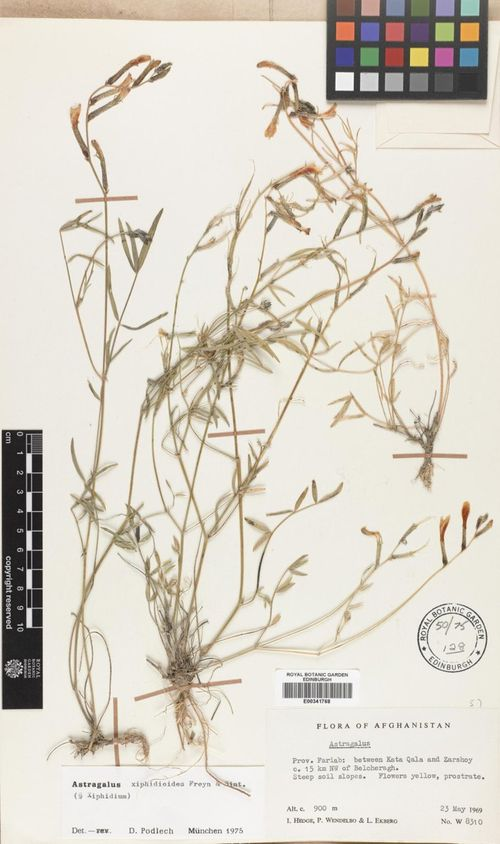

Scientific classification
- Kingdom: Plantae
- Clade: Tracheophytes
- Clade: Angiosperms
- Clade: Eudicots
- Clade: Rosids
- Order: Fabales
- Family: Fabaceae
- Subfamily: Faboideae
- Genus: Astragalus
- Species: A. xiphidioides

Binomial name
- Astragalus xiphidioides Freyn. & Sint., 1905

= Astragalus xiphidioides =

Species of flowering plant

Astragalus xiphidioides is a species of flowering plant in the family Fabaceae, first described by Josef Franz Freyn and Paul Sintenis in 1905. A. xiphidioides is native to Afghanistan and south Turkmenistan. It has been reported from Ashgabat, Türkmenabat, and Türkmenbaşy.

Astragalus xiphidioides is a perennial.
