= Jean-Christophe Heyland =

Swiss engraver, watercolourist and illustrator

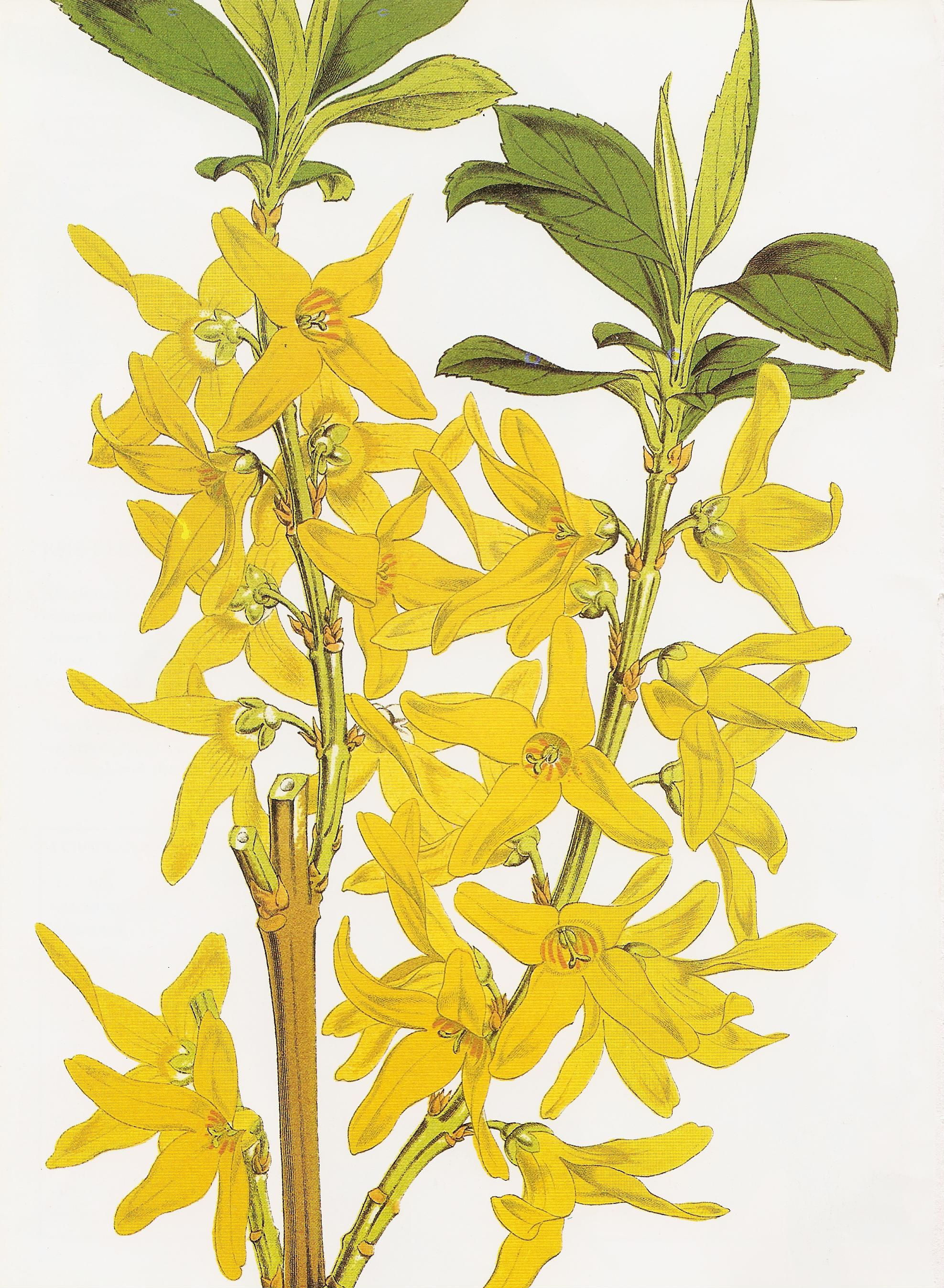
Forsythia viridissima

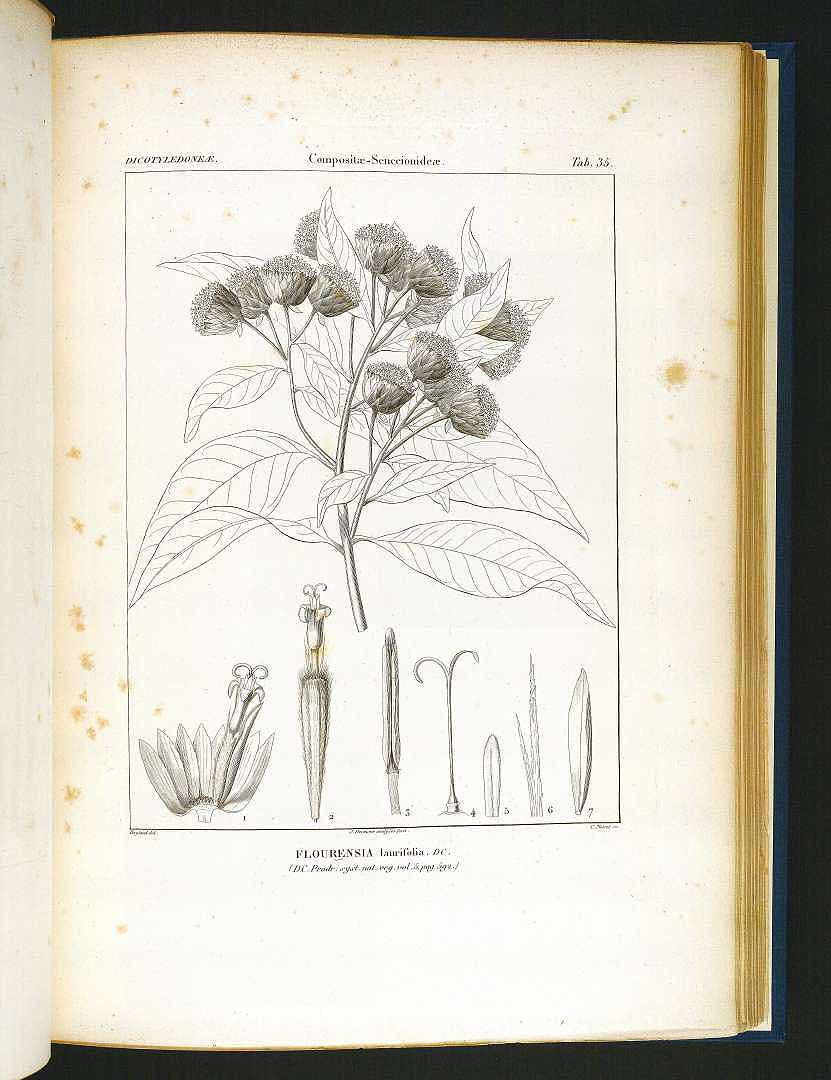
Flourensia laurifolia Icones selectae plantarum, vol. 4: t. 35 (1839)

Jean-Christophe [Kumpfler] Heyland (1791 Frankfurt – 29 August 1866 Genoa), was a Swiss engraver, watercolourist, and illustrator, who produced the plates for many botanical works such as the 1825-27 Plantes Rares du Jardin de Geneve by Augustin Pyramus de Candolle. He lived in Geneva from 1803, and produced all illustrations for botanical memoirs published by Geneva botanists after 1820. He also illustrated the work of Benjamin Delessert, Philip Barker-Webb, Giuseppe Giacinto Moris, Pierre Edmond Boissier and others.

== Early life ==
Baptised Jean-Christophe Kumpfler, he went to Geneva in his youth as an apprentice hairdresser to an uncle named Heyland, whose surname he subsequently adopted. He showed a keen interest in the graphic arts, and employed his leisure time in studying drawing and engraving. After spending a few years in London, where he was a designer of costumes for the theatre, he returned and settled in Geneva.

== Career ==
José Mariano Mociño and Martín de Sessé worked on a Flora Mexicana and after de Sessé's death in 1808, Mociño met de Candolle in 1813 in Montpellier and showed him the drawings they had produced for the planned work. De Candolle requested that the plates be copied by artists of the Geneva community. Of these copied plates, the sixteen done by Heyland caught de Candolle's eye. Guided by de Candolle he became one of the leading botanical artists of the period, working for him for 24 years. One of his students was Jean-Louis Berlandier who also showed great aptitude in his botanical illustrations.

Becoming a citizen of Geneva in 1819, Heyland was admitted to the Society of Arts and the Swiss Society of Natural Sciences. The Archduke Reynier, Viceroy of Lombardy, commissioned him in 1849 to work at the botanical garden in Monza. In 1859 he returned to Geneva, where he lived on the proceeds from the lessons he gave in drawing.

From 1835 he worked as principal artist on Charles Antoine Lemaire's Jardin Fleuriste. He drew and engraved 5 full-page illustrations, including Impatiens parviflora for de Candolle's Quatrieme Notice sur Les Plantes Rares. Between 1839 and 1846 he produced the illustrations for volumes 4-5 of Icones selectae plantarum, another of de Candolle's projects in collaboration with Benjamin Delessert (1773-1847). He carried out several commissions for the Geneva Botanical Garden, and directed the engraving and printing in colour of the 180 plates used for 'Voyage botanique en Espagne'.

== Later life and legacy ==
In his old age he suffered from trembling hands and failing eyesight, but retained his good humour to the end. His final contribution to botanical art was the 122 plates he produced for Pierre Edmond Boissier's 1866 work, "Icones Euphorbiarum".

Augustin Pyramus de Candolle created the genus Heylandia in 1825 in his honour, a genus which is now included in Crotalaria.

Heyland died on 29 August 1866 at a village near Genoa, during a trip in Italy. He had married Louise Françoise Jouvet and had two sons, Jeanne Marie (1826) and Jacques François, both born in Geneva. Jaques François Kumpfler (alias Francesco Heyland), born in Geneva on 26 August 1830, became a daguerreotypist and photographer active in Milan (Italy), initially with his father ("Heyland et fils" = "Heyland e figlio"), then in association with the French photographers Hippolyte and Victor Deroche (in the firm "Deroche & Heyland - Photographie Parisienne, al grand Mercurio"), and finally he worked on his own ("Francesco Heyland").

In 1877, Boissier & Reuter named an Iris after him Iris heylandiana in the Botanical Journal of the Linnean Society (J. Linn. Soc. Bot.) Vol.16 on page 142.

== Bibliography ==
- The complete biographies of Jean-Christophe Kumpfler (Heyland) and of his son Jean François have been published on the book by Roberto Caccialanza, DEROCHE & HEYLAND. Origini e storie dei celebri fotografi: curiosità, notizie e immagini inedite, Fantigrafica (Cremona, Italy), 2019, pp. 21–27.
