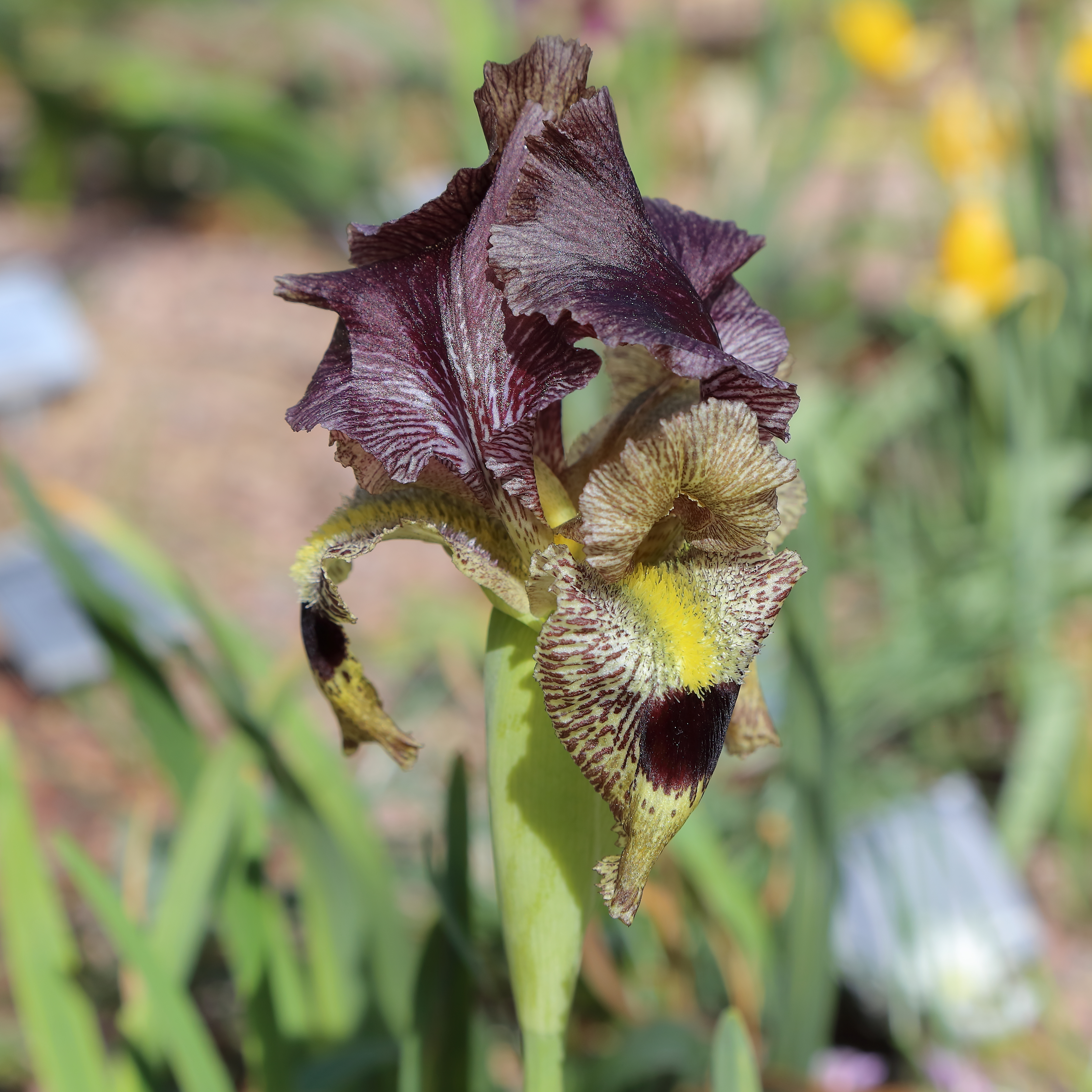

Scientific classification
- Kingdom: Plantae
- Clade: Tracheophytes
- Clade: Angiosperms
- Clade: Monocots
- Order: Asparagales
- Family: Iridaceae
- Genus: Iris
- Species: I. sari

Binomial name
- Iris sari Schott ex Baker

Synonyms
- Iris lupina Foster; Iris manissadjianii Freyn; Iris sari var. lurida Boiss.; Oncocyclus sari (Schott ex Baker) Klatt

= Iris sari =

Species of plant

Iris sari is a species in the genus Iris, it is also in the subgenus Iris and in section Oncocyclus. It is from the rocky steppes and hills of Turkey. It has curved or straight leaves, cream, greenish or yellowish flowers which are variable and veined with crimson, purple-brown, reddish brown, reddish-purple or black. It has a dark maroon, rich crimson or brown signal patch and gold or yellow beard.

== Description ==
Iris sari is a hardy perennial, with a tuberous rhizome, which is up to 2 cm in diameter. Under the rhizome are long secondary roots, which locate mineral salts to absorb.

It has 5-7 leaves, which can be slightly curved, falcate shaped or almost straight, or sword shaped. They are small, and 0.3-0.9 cm wide,

It is intermediate in size between the smaller species of the Caucasus region, such as Iris acutiloba, and the large Syrian plants as Iris lortetii and Iris gatesii.

The plant can reach up to 10–30 cm (4–12 in) tall, and it has a straight stem, which is about 6–30 cm (2–12 in) tall and ends in a single flower.

It blossoms in late spring, between April and June. The flowers are about 7–10 cm (3–4 in) across. or 12–15 cm (5–6 in) in diameter. They have a pleasant scent.

They have a cream, greenish or yellowish ground or base colour, which is variable and veined with crimson, purple-brown, reddish brown, reddish-purple or black.

Like other irises, it has two pairs of petals: three large sepals (outer petals), known as the 'falls', and three inner, smaller petals (or tepals), known as the 'standards'. Both falls and standards may be more or less ruffled, or wavy and have an undulating shape. The erect standards, are ovoid, roundish, obovate or sub-orbicular in shape, 6–8.5 cm (2–3 in) long and 3.5–5.8 cm (1–2 in) wide and they are often darker than the falls. Sometimes the standards are bluish purple in colour. The falls are elliptic, obtuse or rounded in shape, 5–8 cm (2–3 in) long and 2.8–4.5 cm (1–2 in) wide. They usually have the sides bent back and often with the apex of the petal curled under. In the middle of the falls is a signal patches, which is dark maroon, rich crimson or brown. Behind the signal patch on the falls is a row of short, dense bristles or hairs which are white tinged with yellow, golden yellow, or are plain yellow, which makes its 'beard'.

The flower also has pale yellow finely streaked with brown style arms, which are 4–5.5 cm (2–2 in) long and 1.3–2 cm wide. The bract and bracteole are 5–9.5 cm (2–4 in) long and the perianth tube is 2–2.5 cm (1–1 in) long.

After the iris has flowered, in October, it produces a fruit capsule containing the seeds. It has 3 flaps, it is spindle shaped and 4.5–6 cm (2–2 in) long, and 1.5–2.3 cm (1–1 in) wide.

=== Biochemistry ===
As most irises are diploid, having two sets of chromosomes. This can be used to identify hybrids and classification of groupings. It has a chromosome count of 2n=20.

Tetraploids were induced successfully from in vitro plantlets of I. sari by treating the micro-bulbs with colchicine.

== Taxonomy ==
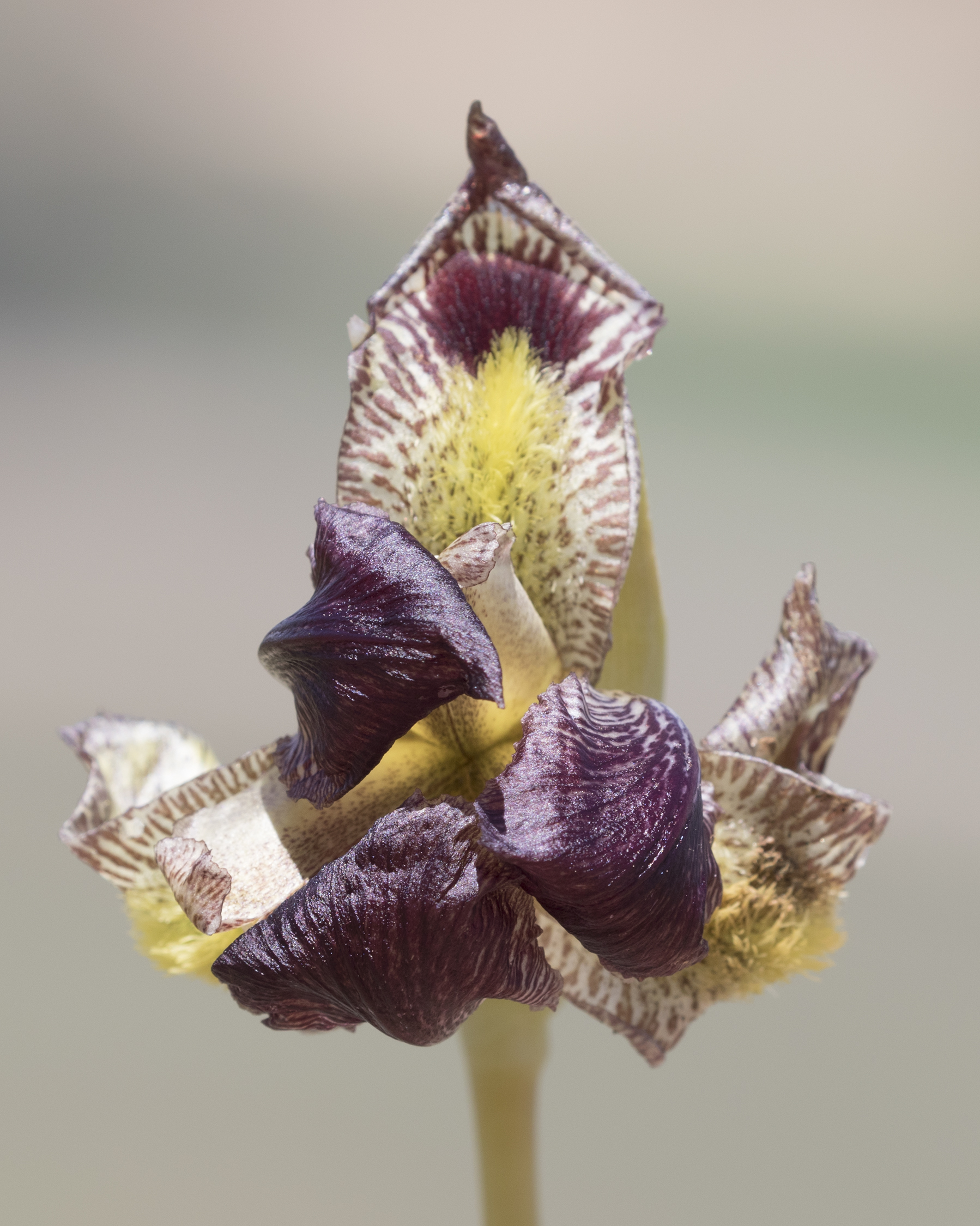
Iris sari ssp. manissadjianii

I. sari is also known as "Ana kurtkulağı," in Turkish.

In Ovacık, Dersim it is known locally as Bahar çiçeği.

The Latin specific epithet sari refers to the River Sarum in Turkey, (an ancient name, as the river is now called the Seyhan River) since the iris was found on the flood plains of the river, in the Cilicia region.

It was first found by plant hunter Kotschy in 1854 in Asia Minor, (now called Turkey). It was then first published by botanist Schott in The Gardeners' Chronicle (magazine) series 2, in issue 5 on page 788 in 1876, based on an earlier description by Baker.

In 1882, it was also published by Boissier in 'Fl. Orient.' Issue 5 on page 131, but he misnamed it as Iris saarii.

It was verified as Iris sari by United States Department of Agriculture and the Agricultural Research Service on 4 March 2003, and is an accepted name by the RHS and it was last listed in the RHS Plant Finder in 2016.

Due to the wide range in geographical area and habitat, the iris has the tendency to vary in the size of the flowers and leaves. This led to the idea that there have been thought to be two forms, with one small form which was called I. manissadjianii Freyn located near Amasya. Manissadjianii was named after an Armenian schoolteacher and botanist J. J. Manissadijan and friend of Freyn. Manissadjianii has also been called a subspecies as well. In 1887, Foster named another form as Iris lupina as the colour of the flower matched a fox. They are now both considered to be synonyms of Iris sari.

There is also a white-violet variant with purple veining on the standards and it has a white beard.

== Distribution and habitat ==
It is native to temperate Asia.

=== Range ===
It is endemic to Turkey. Its population is widely scattered across the country from central and SE Turkey, in the Provinces of Çankırı Province, Amasya and Ankara, then east to Bayburt, Erzurum and the mountains south of Lake Van.

The RHS source is the only one to mention Northern Iran and the Caucasus, so assume this is a mistake by them.

=== Habitat ===
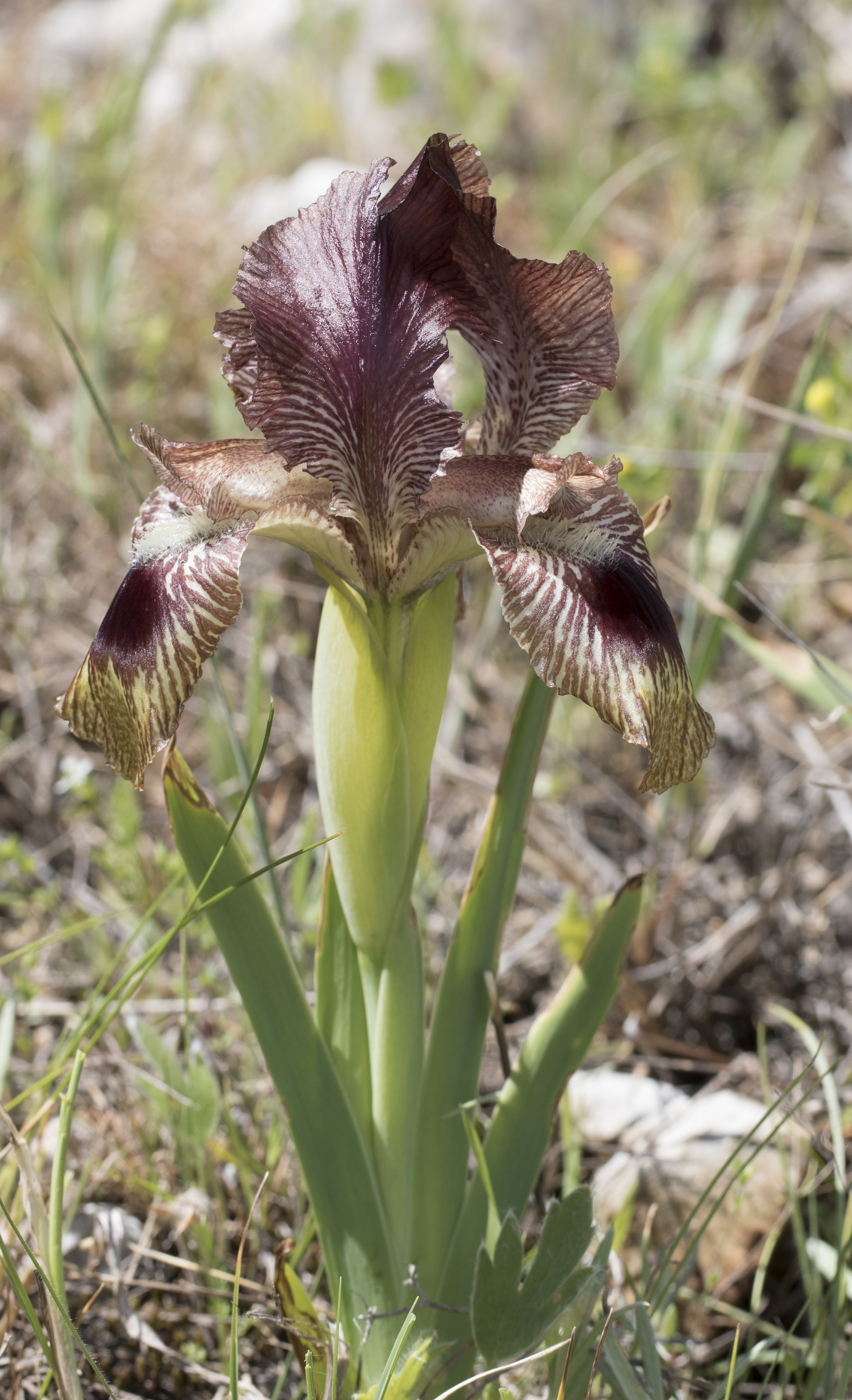
Iris sari

It grows on rocky steppe area, on rich mountain slopes, on stony hills and on rubble covered slopes. The plants can be found at an altitudes of between 900–2,700 m (3,000–8,900 ft) above sea level.

It often found growing with tall umbellifers, peonies, vetches among oak scrub.

== Cultivation ==
I. sari is known to be fairly easy to grow, and it can be cultivated in an Alpine house or bulb frame, where it should be given sharp drainage and some protection from winter wet, although it is normally cold hardy. and should flower every year. Over 10 or more years, several plants of the species have been known to survive and re-flower in Surrey.

In more drier and hardier areas, it can be grown in rockeries, as long as the plant has a summer drought, which imitates the special xerothermic conditions.

Irises can generally be propagated by division, or by seed growing.

== Variations ==
Iris sari has a few known cultivars: 'Lupina', 'Manissadjianii', 'Sari Lurida',

== Hybrids ==
Iris sari crosses: (with Iris gatesii 'Abou Ben Adhem', 'Dove', 'Persian Chocolate', 'Shadrach', (with Iris korolkowii) 'Thor' ¼ Iris sari crosses: 'Leo's Magic', 'Summer Wind', 'Thormila'.

== Uses ==
Iris sari has been used a folk medicinal plant in Turkey. The flowers have been used in an infusion to treat colds.

== Toxicity ==
Like many other irises, most parts of the plant are poisonous (including rhizome and leaves), if mistakenly ingested, it can cause stomach pains and vomiting. Also handling the plant may cause a skin irritation or an allergic reaction.

== Other sources ==
- Davis, P. H., ed. 1965–1988. Flora of Turkey and the east Aegean islands.
- Mathew, B. 1981. The Iris. 57.
