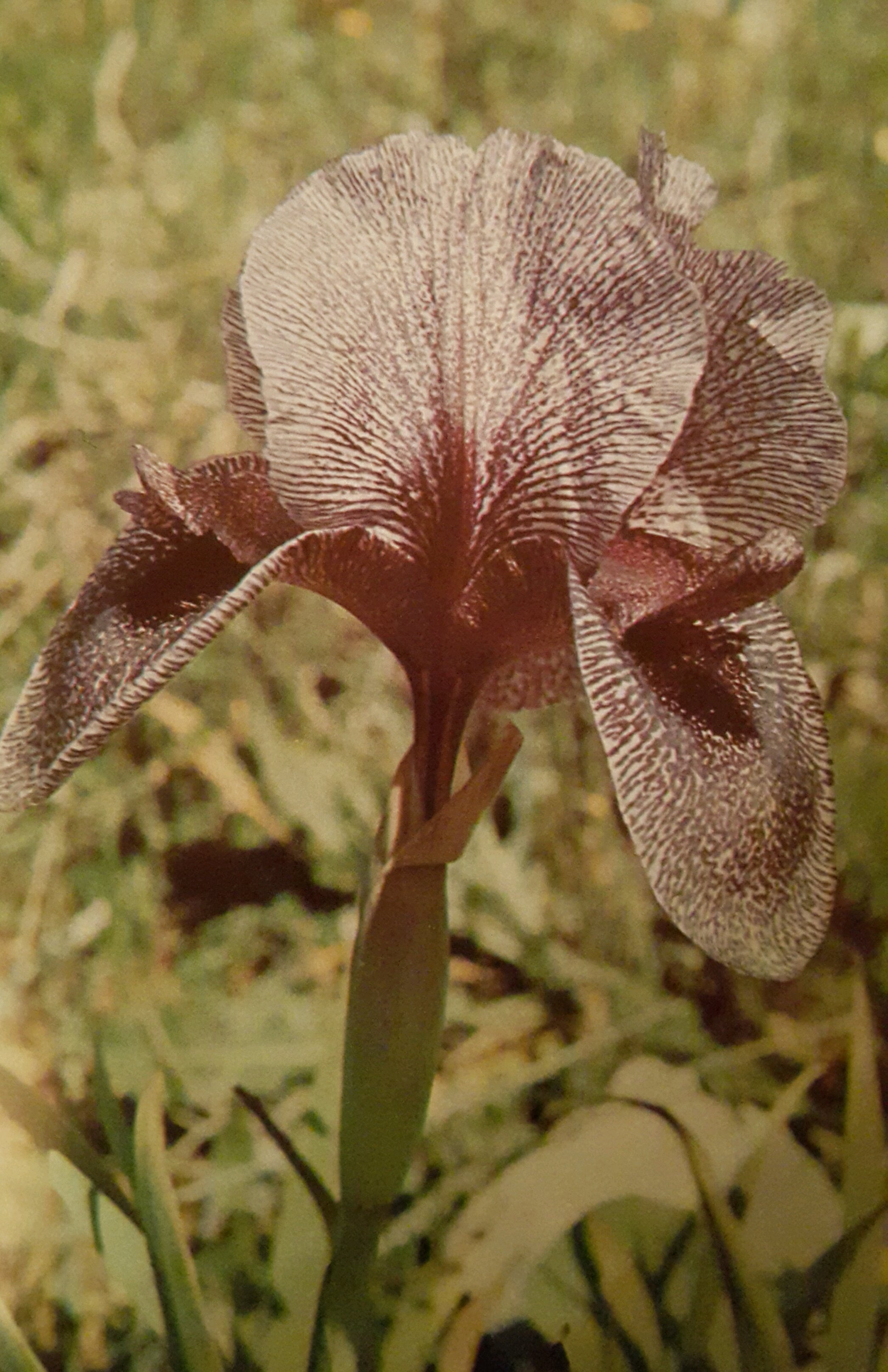
- Iris susiana

Scientific classification
- Kingdom: Plantae
- Clade: Tracheophytes
- Clade: Angiosperms
- Clade: Monocots
- Order: Asparagales
- Family: Iridaceae
- Genus: Iris
- Subgenus: Iris subg. Iris
- Section: Iris sect. Oncocyclus
- Species: I. susiana

Binomial name
- Iris susiana Linnaeus

Synonyms
- Iris grandiflora Salisb.; Iris kasruwana Dinsm.; Iris livida Tratt.; Iris punctata Moench; Iris sofarana Foster; Iris sofarana f. franjieh Chaudhary, G.Kirkw. & C.Weymouth; Iris sofarana subsp. kasruwana (Dinsm.) Chaudhary, G.Kirkw. & C.Weymouth; Iris sofarana f. kasruwana (Dinsm.) Mouterde; Iris sofarana var. magnifica Siehe; Oncocyclus susianus (L.) K.Koch

= Iris susiana =

Species of plant

Iris susiana, commonly known as the mourning iris, is a species of perennial plant in the family Iridaceae. The mourning iris is native to the Middle East. It grows in Lebanon, Syria and Turkey, although it is believed to be extinct in the wild. It is popular as a cut flower as the flowers can easily span 12 centimeters (5 inches). The survival of the species is seriously threatened by excessive picking.

== Description ==
Iris susiana has a short, compact, brown rhizome and long secondary roots that grow beneath the soil. Stems can grow to 30–38 cm (12–15 in) tall. The leaves can reach 25 cm long and 5–12 mm wide. The leaves are glaucous and slightly curved, and the spathes slightly dilate at the base. It has one flower per stem, which blooms in May. Like other irises, the flowers have two pairs of petals: three large sepals (outer petals, known as the 'falls') and three inner, smaller petals (or tepals, known as the 'standards'). External tepals are reflexed, ovate, approximately 7 cm long and 4 cm wide, and strongly spotted with purple on a bluish-white base. Internal tepals are erect, with a color similar to or lighter than its external tepals. Veins are white or purplish. Branches of the plant's style (part of the stigma) are 2–3 cm long. It has short, rounded lobes and a denticulate margin.

=== Genetics ===
As with most irises, Iris susiana is diploid, having two sets of chromosomes. Its diploid cells have 20 chromosomes. Genetic variations give rise to phenotypic differences which can be used to identify hybrids and classification of groupings.

== Taxonomy ==
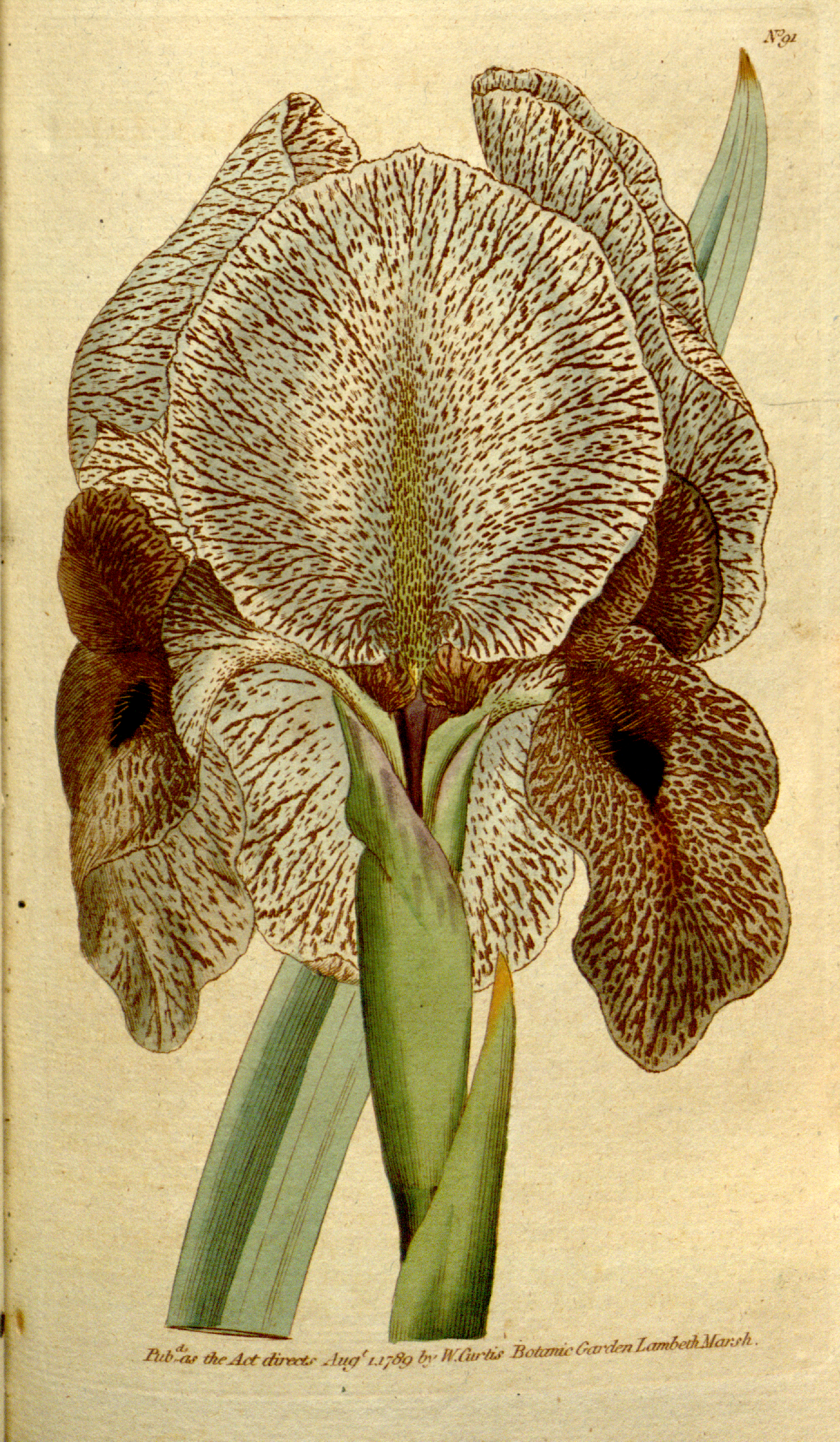
Iris susiana, Carl Linnaeus.

Iris susiana has the common name of mourning iris. Other common names include 'chalcedonian iris', 'great-flowered iris', 'great spotted iris', and 'mourning widow'.

Iris susiana has been cultivated since 7000 BCE. It was taken from Turkey and introduced to gardens in Vienna in 1573. The botanist Carl Linnaeus discovered it in Persia, and then published and described it in his book Species Plantarum in 1753. The name Iris susiana is a reference to these Persian roots: in classical literature, the Persian civilization of Elam was also known as Susiana, a name derived from its capital Susa.

One of the synonyms of the iris, I. sofarana, owes its name to the summer resort Sofar, where it was collected by Hartmann in 1899. It was then described by Sir Michael Foster, in Gardeners' Chronicle ser. 3, vol.26: on page 389.

It was verified as Iris susiana by the United States Department of Agriculture and the Agricultural Research Service on 4 April 2003.

== Distribution and habitat ==
Iris susiana is prevalent in Lebanon, Turkey and Syria. It grows in mountainous terrain, typically on eastern slopes in rocky areas.

== Cultivation ==
Irises can generally be propagated by division. Iris susiana can be grown in sunny nooks within a rock garden, on sheltered banks or in borders. It needs light, warmth and well-drained soil.

== Toxicity ==
Like many other irises, most parts of the plant (including the rhizome and leaves) are poisonous. If ingested, it can cause stomach pains and vomiting. Handling the plant may cause a skin irritation or an allergic reaction in some individuals.

== Culture ==
The Taj Mahal in India has images of Iris susiana carved from stone.

== Other sources ==
- Aldén, B., S. Ryman, & M. Hjertson. 2012. Svensk Kulturväxtdatabas, SKUD (Swedish Cultivated and Utility Plants Database; online resource) www.skud.info
- Georges Tohme& Henriette Tohme, Illustrated Flora of Lebanon, National Council For Scientific Research, Second Edition 2014.
- Mathew, B. 1981. The Iris. 59.
