= Josef Franz Freyn =

Austrian civil engineer and botanist

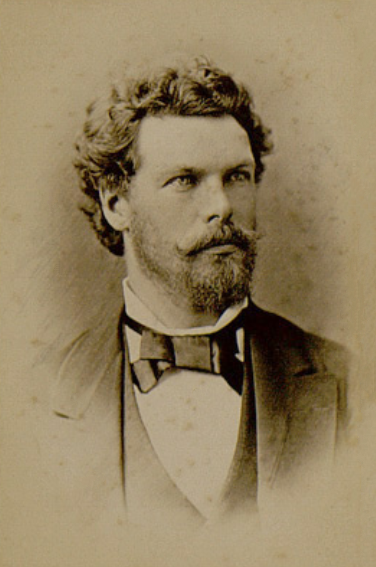
Josef Franz Freyn, c. 1879

Josef Franz Freyn (7 December 1845, Prague – 16 January 1903, Prague-Smíchov) was an Austrian civil engineer and botanist.

He was the son of the Austrian forester Josef Freyn from Obecnic. In 1856-1862 he attended the Oberrealschule in Prague. After that, he studied at the technical Polytechnic (technische Hochschule) in Prague, but interrupted his study for a placement in forestry. In 1865-1867 he studied engineering at the technical Polytechnic (technische Hochschule) in Vienna. Afterwards he was employed in the construction of railways in Hungary and later worked in Istria (1874–1878), and in the meantime conducted investigations of regional flora. In 1878 he relocated to Opočno, later returning to Prague (1881), where he owned a construction company.

As a botanist Freyn was self-taught — he reportedly never attended a formal lecture on botany. In addition to research of Hungarian and Istrian flora, he processed botanical collections from the Iberian Peninsula, Bosnia-Herzegovina, Turkestan et al. He acted as an intermediator to the plant collector Ferdynand Karo and supported him with the curation, identification and the distribution of his plant material in exsiccata-like specimen sets under the title F. Karo Plantae Dahuricae. As a botanical collector he collaborated with Joseph Friedrich Nicolaus Bornmüller, Eduard Hackel, Paul Sintenis. and J. J. Manissadijan Freyn is remembered for his specialized studies of individual plant species, especially those within the genera Ranunculus and Hieracium. An obituary was published by Eduard Hackel.

== Selected publications ==
- Die Flora von Süd-Istrien, 1878 - Flora of southern Istria.
- Beitrag zur Flora von Bosnien und der angrenzenden Hercegovina. 1888 - Contributions involving the flora of Bosnia and in particular Herzegovina.
- Zur Kenntniss einiger Arten der Gattung Ranunculus, 1881 - Treatise on species of the genus Ranunculus.
- Ueber neue und bemerkenswerthe orientalische Pflanzenarten, 3, Bulletin de l'Herbier Boissier 6(11), 1898 - On new and remarkable Oriental plant species.
- "Plantae ex Asia media (Fragmentum): Enumeratio plantarum in Turania a Cl. Sintensis ann. 1900-1901 lectarum, additis quibusdam in regione Caspica, Transcaspica, Turkestanica, praesertim in Altiplanite Pamir a cl. Ove Paulsen ann. 1898-1899 aliisque in Turkestania a V. F. Brotherus ann. 1896 lectis"; publisher: Genève : Imprimerie Romet, (1906).
- Plantae novae Orientales. Österreichische botanische Zeitschrift 1894, 324-327.
