= Ira Schreiber Nelson =

- Born: 1911; St. Joseph Missouri
- Died: 1965 (aged 53–54); Lafayette Louisiana
- Citizenship: U.S.
- Education: Iowa State University
- Spouse: Barbara Nelson
- Scientific career
- Fields: Botany, Spermatophytes
- Author abbrev. (botany): I.S.Nelson

Ira Schreiber Nelson (1911–1965) was an American botanist, working in Louisiana.

== Career ==
A member of the Southwestern Louisiana Institute and University of Southwestern Louisiana Horticulture Departments. His interests were iris and camellias, two major flowers native to south Louisiana. He died suddenly in an automobile accident in 1965.

Lowell Randolph (a Cornell University botany professor) had collaborated with Ira S. "Ike" Nelson since 1942, after the first show of the 'Society for Louisiana Irises' was held. They both identified a new iris from Abbeville, Louisiana. Randolph named the new iris after him. Iris nelsonii was then first published and described by Randolph in 'Baileya' (a Quarterly Journal of Horticultural Taxonomy of Ithaca, New York) 14: 150 in 1966.

== Publications ==
- The Influence of Hydrofuramide Upon Seed Germination and Control of Pythium in Tomatoes. Iowa State College, 1939

== Awards ==
- 1964 American Horticultural Society Teaching Award

== Sources ==
- University of Louisiana, Lafayette: Ira Schreiber Nelson Collection
- Harvard University Herbarium:Ira Schreiber Nelson
