= Iris × fulvala =

Scientific classification
- Kingdom: Plantae
- Clade: Tracheophytes
- Clade: Angiosperms
- Clade: Monocots
- Order: Asparagales
- Family: Iridaceae
- Genus: Iris
- Species: I. × fulvala

Binomial name
- Iris × fulvala Dykes

Hybrid species of plant

Iris × fulvala is a hybrid species between Iris brevicaulis and Iris fulva (American copper iris).

== Description ==
This iris grows up to 75 cm tall, spreads through roots, and has slender green leaves. In summer, it produces deep reddish-purple flowers, 5–12 cm wide, with yellow markings on the petals.
