= Joseph Mason (artist) =

American illustrator

Joseph Mason (1808 – October 8, 1842) (Note: The birth date used here comes from his tombstone. Other birth dates—1802 and 1807—have been used in various sources. The year of his birth has been disputed in part because of statements by Audubon, in part because Mason has been confused at times with another Joseph Mason who is listed in census records as living in Ohio around the same time. If he was born in 1807, he would have been only 13 rather than 18 when he accompanied Audubon, which seems improbable; however, the most careful source on this subject (Richards) presents credible evidence that Mason may in fact have been 13 and passed for 18 due to being unusually large and adept for his age.) was an American artist who worked as an assistant to John James Audubon, painting uncredited plant-life backgrounds for some 50 of his bird studies for the book The Birds of America.

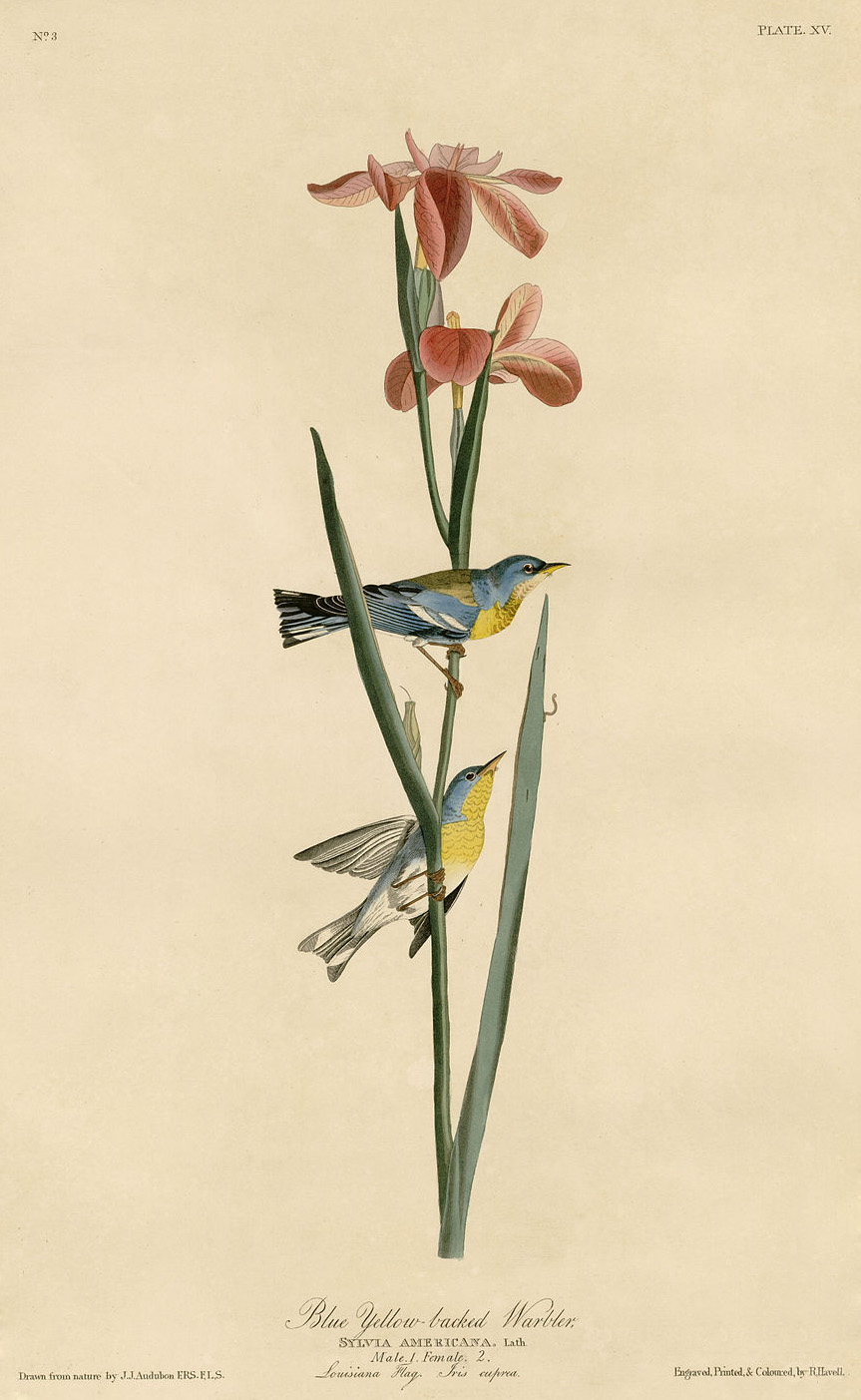
Plate 15 from Birds of America, with northern parula birds (then called blue yellow-backed warblers) painted by John James Audubon and an Iris fulva flower stalk painted by Joseph Mason, 1821. The original watercolor is held by the New York Historical Society.

== Early life ==
Joseph Mason, who is listed in some sources as Joseph R. Mason, was born in Delaware, Ohio, the son of Joseph Wilson Mason (a bookseller), and later moved to Cincinnati, Ohio.

== Career ==
=== Tutelage under Audubon ===
When Audubon came to Cincinnati for a short time in 1820, Mason became his pupil, showing exceptional talent, especially as a draftsperson. Audubon later wrote in a letter to his wife that Mason had a "fine" talent for painting and "draws flowers better than any man probably in America, thou knowest I do not flatter young artists much, I never said this to him, but I think so". Audubon hired Mason as his assistant to paint the floral backgrounds of his bird pictures as they traveled south down the Ohio and Mississippi rivers to New Orleans. A good shot, Mason also undertook other expedition duties, shooting many specimen birds as well as rowing the boat and ferrying supplies.

=== Traveling with Audubon ===
During the two years he traveled with Audubon (October 1820 to August 1822), Mason painted, by his own reckoning, between 150 and 200 background watercolors for Audubon. Over 50 of these were used, uncredited, in Audubon's book of 450 bird paintings. For example, for Audubon's study of two blue yellow-backed warblers (now known as northern parula birds; plate 15 of Birds of America), Mason painted an image of Iris fulva, the copper iris, which Audubon called Louisiana flag. Similarly, plate 73 shows Mason's painting of a branch of Magnolia grandiflora (southern magnolia, called by Audubon great magnolia) on which is perched a Canada warbler (called by Audubon Bonaparte's flycatching warbler). A former curator of the National Gallery of Art considers that Mason's backgrounds significantly contribute to the scientific worth of Audubon's project because of how they help to establish scale, proportion, and environment.

=== Uncredited work ===
It appears that Audubon may not have intended to give Mason credit for his work, as he had Mason sign his name in pencil while he signed his own name to the finished works in ink. By the mid 1830s, Mason was unhappy with how Audubon had treated him, and in 1834 he wrote of Audubon in a letter to the author and critic John Neal:

I looked on him as my greatest friend; and it never once entered my mind that he would do me injustice when he came to publish his work. This it appears he has done.

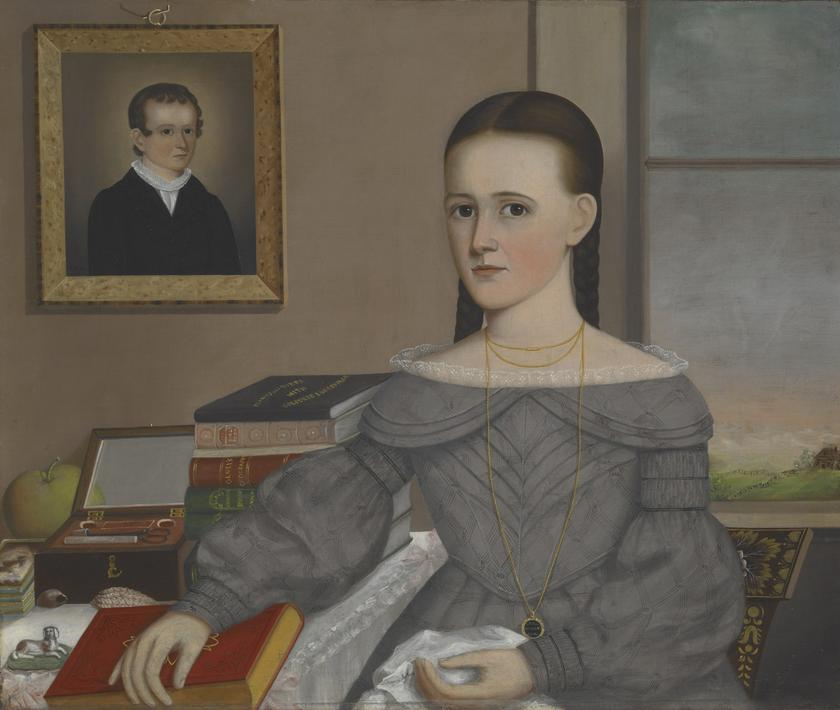
A portrait by Mason of Marie Jane Andrew.

Neal would go on to express serious reservations about Audubon's honesty and trustworthiness in several 1835 issues of The New England Galaxy, of which he was then senior editor. Among other things, he alleges that Audubon had promised Mason that his name would be on the relevant plates of The Birds of America.

== Later life ==
Mason returned to Cincinnati in 1822 to assist his mother, who was then newly widowed. Mason lived in Cincinnati for the remainder of his life except for a couple of years in Philadelphia (1829–32) and short trips to Michigan (1840–41) and Indiana (1841). He established himself as a private art teacher and portrait painter; this later work is rather wooden compared to his botanical paintings.

== Death and legacy ==
He died of pneumonia on October 8, 1842. In the early 2000s, wildlife artist John Ruthven became interested in Mason's life and determined to track down his grave, the location of which was then unknown. Ruthven discovered that Mason had originally been buried in a downtown cemetery and was later moved to Spring Grove Cemetery and Arboretum. Ruthven joined forces with other Cincinnati civic leaders to create a bronze relief marker memorializing Mason's contribution to the monumental Birds of America; it was dedicated in 2013.
