= Lora La Mance =

American horticulturist, writer

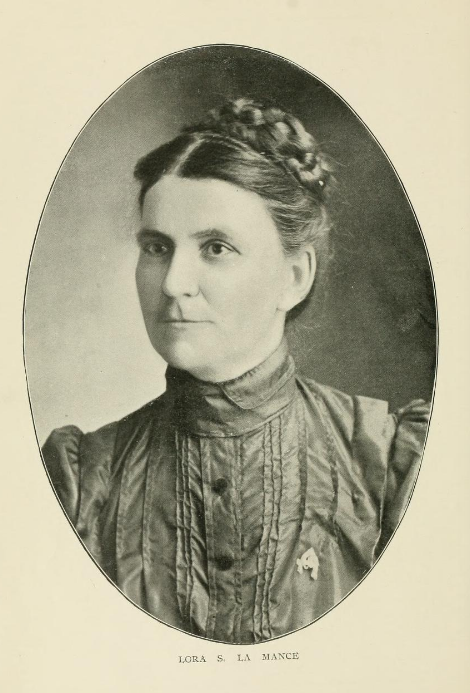
- Born: Lora Sarah Nichols; 2 April 1857; Wolcottville, Indiana
- Died: 9 May 1939 (aged 82); Lake Wales, Florida
- Occupation: Horticulturist
- Spouse: Marcus N. La Mance (m. 1880; died in 1906)

Lora Sarah La Mance (2 April 1857 – 9 May 1939) was an American horticulturist and writer, on gardening. She also published genealogical research.

== Life ==
Born Lora Sarah Nichols, in 1857 in Indiana, the tenth and last child of Kezia (Waltman) and Nelson Irvin Nichols (1812-1865) - himself a twelfth child. Lora married, on 14 April 1880, Marcus N. La Mance (1844-1906) who ran a dry-goods store, and was post master, and several times country treasurer. They had one daughter, Lora Lee (1881-1941). Both Lora and Lora Lee were members of Daughters of the American Revolution (DAR), under multiple lines of descent.

La Mance was active in the temperance cause and was local and county president of the Women's Christian Temperance Union (WCTU), which took the county dry. Le Mance also worked for the suffragette cause.

In 1904 she published an extensive family history of the Greene family, inspired by the research of her grandmother.

After her husband's death in 1906 she became more active in the cause of temperance and became a national organizer and lecturer, traveling extensively, both in North America and overseas.

In 1928 she published a family history of the Waltman family, descendants of Conrad Waltman, many of whom fought in the American Revolution, and through which family she claimed some of the lines of descent for her DAR applications.

La Mance is buried with her husband in Pineville Cemetery McDonald County, Missouri.

== Works ==
- The Greene family and its branches from A.D. 861 to A.D. 1904 (with poems descriptive of the text by Mrs Attie A Stowe) (1904) ISBN 1294825240
- The House of Waltman and its Allied Families (1928)
- Beautiful Home Surroundings:A Book of Practical Information Regarding the Garden and Lawn. New York: J. I. Childs. 1892.
- House Plants:A Book of Practical Information Regarding the Culture of House and Greenhouse Plants. New York: J. I. Childs. 1892.
- Jesus the Christ (1938)

== Legacy ==
The Lemance iris is named after her.
