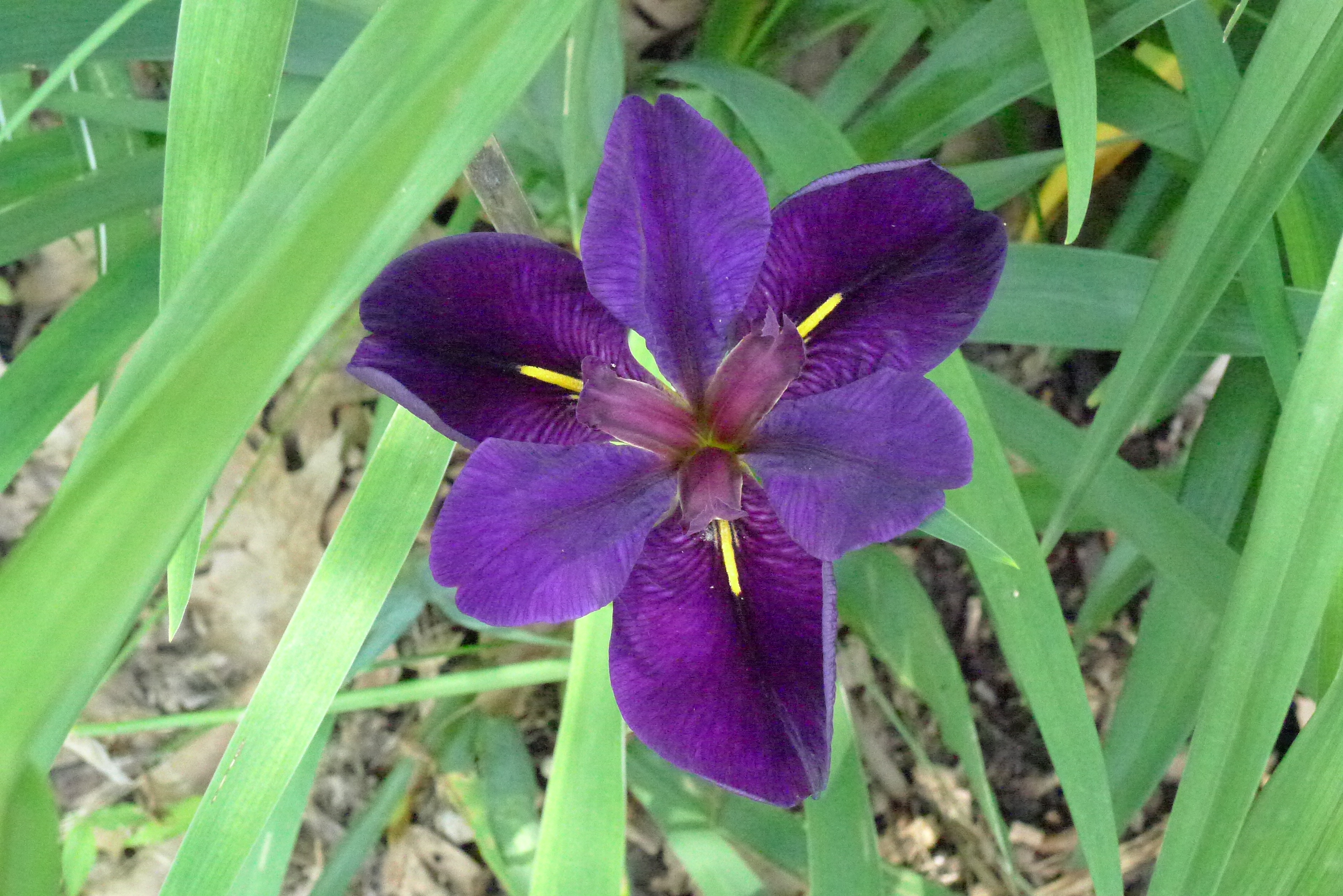
- "Black Gamecock", a popular Louisiana iris cultivar

Scientific classification
- Kingdom: Plantae
- Clade: Tracheophytes
- Clade: Angiosperms
- Clade: Monocots
- Order: Asparagales
- Family: Iridaceae
- Genus: Iris
- Subgenus: Iris subg. Limniris
- Section: Iris sect. Limniris
- Series: Iris ser. Hexagonae

Species
- Iris brevicaulis; Iris fulva; Iris giganticaerulea; Iris hexagona; Iris nelsonii; Iris savannarum

= Louisiana iris =

Group of flowering plants

Louisiana iris is a taxonomic group (Iris ser. Hexagonae) of five iris species native to Louisiana and surrounding regions of the southeastern United States: Iris fulva, Iris hexagona, Iris brevicaulis, Iris giganticaerulea, and Iris nelsonii.

Each recognized species has noticeable phenotypic and habitat differences, yet similarities between their phenotypes and habitats can be drawn. These similarities are partially a result of their similar phylogenies. Many of the species are closely related, some a result of interbreeding, as in the most recent discovery of the Abbeville Red Iris, Iris nelsonii. The five Louisiana irises are often categorized as "The Reds" or "The Blues" according to their corolla color. "The Blues", species Iris brevicaulis, Iris hexagona, and Iris giganticaerulea, typically have blue-purple corollas, with rare white forms. "The Reds", species Iris fulva and Iris nelsonii, typically have red-orange corollas, with rare yellow forms. Between 1920s and 1930s, Dr. John K. Small extensively studied irises in both Florida and Louisiana and named over 80 new species, including Iris savannarum, Iris kimballiae, Iris albispiritus and Iris rivularis. Subsequent research has determined that only Iris savannarum is a true species and the others are synonyms of it.

In 1990, the Louisiana iris was voted the state wildflower of Louisiana. The state flower is the magnolia blossom.

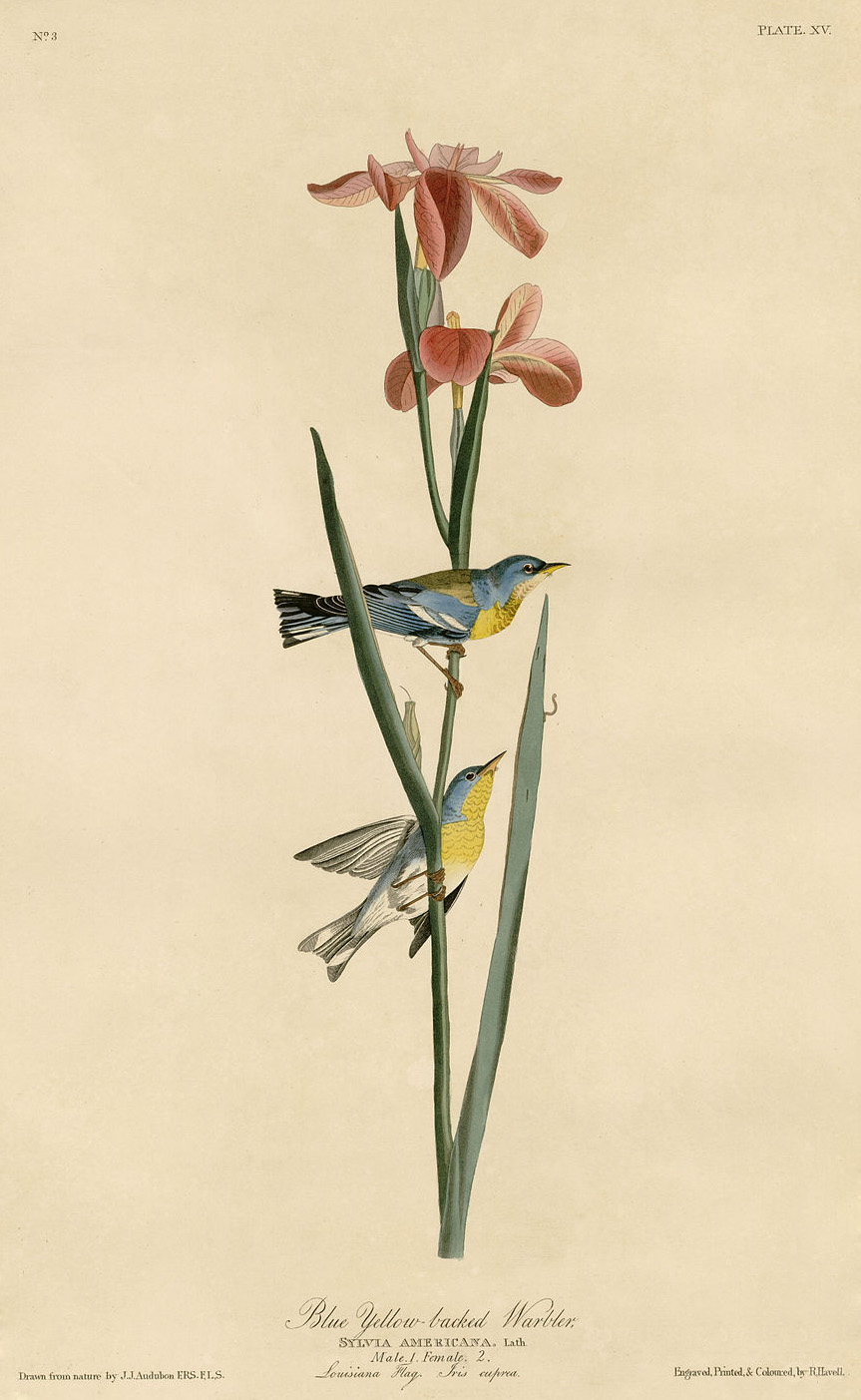
Audubon's Blue Yellow-backed Warbler (northern parula) from Birds of America

== Etymology ==
The Hexagonae series name is derived from the first Louisiana iris species to inhabit the series, Iris hexagona. The name "Louisiana iris" comes from the naturalist and artist John James Audubon. In the 1821, a Louisiana flag (Iris fulva) was painted by his assistant Joseph Mason, then Audubon added his pair of parula warblers. He then used the term 'Louisiana Flag' to describe the painting.

== Iris fulva ==
Iris fulva, common name "copper iris", is noted by its fulva color of rusty red to brownish orange or rare yellow forms. In 1812, this species was named by J.B. Ker-Gawler from a specimen found in the surrounding New Orleans area. The red color of the fulva contributes to the red modern hybrids found in the surrounding habitats in which the iris thrives. It is found in Louisiana, along with other Mississippi Valley habitats in Illinois, Kentucky, and Ohio. Other notable physiological characteristics of the species are its big size (3-4 inches in diameter) and drooping petals.

== Iris hexagona ==
Iris hexagona is the oldest discovered Louisiana iris species. In 1788, the species was named in South Carolina. Confusion in recognizing the iris is often intertwined with Iris giganticaerula. Iris hexagona can also be found in South Carolina and Florida. In Louisiana, the species Iris hexagona is debated to derive from Iris giganticaerula or of the same plant species habitating in its other natural states. There are noticeable differences in blooms, color, and shape when comparing the Florida species and South Carolina species and taxonomists are still determining the difference in classification. Iris hexagona located in Louisiana dwell in wet areas of full or half shade, more specifically ditches, canals, swamps, and slow flowing streams.

== Iris brevicaulis ==
Iris bevicaulis, common name "ZigZag iris" and "Lamance iris", is the most petite Louisiana iris. It is recognized by its zigzag stalk and prominent, numerous flower parts, that open widely. The species does not require as much water to survive, like other Louisiana irises. Due to its minimalist aquatic requirement, habitats can be in the mud, instead of water bodies, or other surroundings to aqueous habitats. One distinguishable feature that separates it from the other blue irises, is its late blooming season. Furthermore, the iris's importance lies in its hardiness; it provides support to many cultivar plants and was pronounced the "show horse" for the Louisiana iris species. Locations of the iris are upland Louisiana and along the Gulf Coast. The irises' pattern of growth moves up the state of Louisiana, ventures north into the Mississippi Valley of Missouri, Kentucky, Illinois, and Ohio.

== Iris giganticaerulea ==
Iris giganticaerulea is the most recognizable Louisiana iris species. This Gulf Coast species is an extremely large blue native plant, found commonly in the City of New Orleans. In the state of Louisiana, the iris grows natively in freshwater marshes, swamps, and woody wetlands. Yet only a few remaining native, wild-growing irises can be found in Louisiana wetlands, located 20 to 30 miles north of New Orleans. Some of the species can be found growing natively along the coasts of Texas and Mississippi.

== Iris nelsonii ==
Iris nelsonii: endemic Abbeville iris in its native habitat of Southeast Abbeville, Louisiana

Iris nelsonii, common name "Abbeville red" or "super fulva", was the most recently discovered and named Louisiana iris. In 1938, W. B. MacMillan discovered the plant species; in 1966 Randolph named the iris. The common name derives from its native habitat that is located in an exclusive area in Southeast Abbeville, Louisiana. They grow in cypress swamps surrounded by shallow water, or other aquatic habitats with shallow water and full shade. The species is hypothesized to originate as a result of a span of several years of closed-off habitats, and interbreeding of other Louisiana iris species (I. fulva, I. giganticaerulea, and I. brevicaulis), causing the species hybrid to gain stability as its own species. The iris's more recent discovery allows for increasing popularity by birthing many current Louisiana iris cultivars. Their physiological properties are similar to the Iris fulva, but they grow taller and have larger corollas. However, they stay true to the red iris family with either red or yellow fulvas. The blooms of the iris can be found from the middle to late month of April.

=== Abbeville reds ===
The iris species in Southeast Abbeville, Louisiana, can reportedly be traced back to its original heritage or origin of descent with the use of pedigree. Some of these pedigrees have been put together with the help of Charles Arny in 1958. Ongoing research of Iris nelsonii can be found in a few university labs, testing for the genetics of the species. The origin of the species, by decoding DNA sequences, may help explain the process of hybridization of new species by introgression. Michael L. Arnold, Ph. D., working in the University of Georgia Department of Genetics, is currently studying this model by observing the genotype of several Iris nelsonii and other iris from the Hexagonae series. Additionally, publication from Texas State University makes additional claims of the genetic phylogeny of the Abbeville Red iris, by testing DNA sequences, with Dr. Noland H. Martin leading the research.

=== Conservation of Iris nelsonii ===
The unique Iris nelsonii species can only be found in the Turkey Island Swamp in Vermillion Parish, Louisiana—property that is privately owned. Amity Bass and Chris Reid are two botanists that are currently involved in the protection and conservation of the species in Louisiana. They have been involved in surveying the privately owned property where the endemic plant resides, and are currently in the process of transplanting some of the rhizomes to replant in a neighboring state park. It is this park, Palmetto Island State Park, and others that Louisiana Department of Wildlife and Fisheries are teaming with to bring public awareness to the conservation issue of Iris nelsonii. By replanting the species and opening educational exhibits, the relatively new hot topic of this endemic plant is now gaining more public awareness. This awareness helped gain the approval for legislative funding by Representative Simone Champagne of Jeanerette in 2011. The state funding provided the Louisiana Department of Wildlife and Fisheries with the means to build the exhibit in the Palmetto Island State Park. The remaining conservation concern is centered on the privately owned Turkey Island Swamp, and the importance of conserving and maintaining Iris nelsonii's natural habitat. With the permission of the land owners, surveys of the swamp are ongoing, with the understanding that, if the swamp habitat is compromised, the endemic Louisiana species will be wiped away. A prominent threat to the swamp resides in the comparing the present-day hydrology to the hydrology of the swamp the year the Abbeville red was discovered. The swamp is not only drier than in 1939, but also more salt concentrated. Changes are a result of the seasonal occurrence of hurricanes in Louisiana and coastal wetland erosion, that sequentially drains into the nearby swamp. Additionally, agricultural influence and man-made alterations to waterways have led to the drier swamp habitat. Overall, the continued reproduction of the iris in the swamp habitat, and the noteworthy isolation of the swamp, are two factors scientists reason are key to the iris's survival, and if compromised, may cause the integrity of the Abbeville Red to be in danger.

== Iris savannarum ==
Iris savannarum, common name: prairie iris or savanna iris, it was published by Dr. John K. Small in 1925. It was once thought to be a variety of Iris hexagona, but then various botanists made the case it was different enough in form and flower to be treated as a separate species.
