= Lester W. Sharp =

- Born: Lester Whyland Sharp; April 21, 1887; Saratoga Springs, New York
- Died: July 17, 1961 (aged 74); Nuevo, California
- Education: Alma College; Johns Hopkins University; University of Chicago
- Occupations: Botanist, professor

Lester Whyland Sharp (April 21, 1887 in Saratoga Springs, New York – July 17, 1961 in Nuevo, California) was an American botanist, a pioneer in cytogenetics.

He received a BS from Alma College in 1908. After two years at Johns Hopkins University, he transferred to the University of Chicago where he received his PhD in 1912. His postdoctoral work was in association with the University of Louvain, Belgium. Subsequently, he was with Cornell University until his retirement as professor emeritus of botany in 1947.

Barbara McClintock worked as a research assistant for Lowell Fitz Randolph and then for Lester W. Sharp, during her graduate studies.

He authored two classical textbooks in cytology: An Introduction to Cytology (1921) and Fundamentals of cytology (1943)

He was vice-president of the American Society of Naturalists in 1924, vice-president of the Botanical Society of America in 1929 and president in 1930. He served on the editorial boards of the American Journal of Botany, Stain Technology and the Botanical Review. He was awarded an honorary DSc by Alma College in 1930 and by the University of Louvain in Belgium in 1957.

In 1915 he was elected a fellow of the American Association for the Advancement of Science. In 1958 he received the Botanical Society of America Merit Award. The nomination from the Cornell University said: "His contributions, both by personal investigations and by successive editions of carefully edited textbooks, have made plant cytology a significant field of Botany."

== Professional humor ==
The wit of professor Sharp was also expressed in humorous vein. The most notable examples are his retirement address as president of the Botanical Society entitled "A Nuclear Century", in which he lively reviews studies on the nucleus. Another one is a hoax presented together with graduate student, Cuthbert Fraser, about the most unusual bird from the Gobi Desert, Eoörnis pterovelox gobiensis, which has later been numerously reprinted in the form of a PhD thesis, e.g., as.
