= Lowell Fitz Randolph =

American scientist

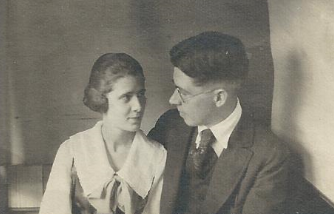
- Botanist Lowell Fitz Randolph and Fannie (his wife) in the 1920s
- Born: 7 October 1894; Alfred, New York, US
- Died: 28 May 1980 (aged 85); Ithaca, Tompkins County, New York State
- Education: Alfred University Cornell College
- Known for: genetics of plants, (Chromosomes)
- Awards: Vaughn Award for outstanding contributions to horticulture from the American Society for Horticultural Science (1944), Distinguished Service Medal from the American Iris Society (1951), Sir Michael Foster Plaque of the British Iris Society (1955), a citation for distinguished contributions to horticulture from the American Horticultural Society (1962), Bronze medal from the Internationale Gartenbauaustellung show, Hamburg, West Germany (1963), Gold medal from the American Iris Society in 1970.
- Scientific career
- Fields: Botany
- Workplaces: Office of Cereal Investigations, United States Department of Agriculture
- Academic advisors: Rollins A. Emerson and Lester W. Sharp
- Notable students: Barbara McClintock
- Author abbrev. (botany): Randolph

Lowell Fitz Randolph (7 October 1894 – 28 May 1980) was an American scientist, in the field of genetics, botany and horticulture. He was a Cornell College graduate who became Professor of Botany and was also employed as an associate cytologist for the United States Department of Agriculture. He was also an avid iris collector and wrote a book on the Iris genus. He carried out research into plant chromosomes of iris, orchid genus and corn plants (such as maize). He was sometimes known as "Fitz" by his friends and associates.

== Education and early life ==
Lowell Fitz Randolph, was born on 7 October 1894 in Alfred, New York. Lowell's family had over 200 years of history of being deeply involved in the Seventh Day Baptist Church community, and that Lowell and his sister Vida were the first to break with that community and strong tradition and follow independent, secular paths pursuing their passion for science.

In 1918, he then went to Cornell College to complete his Ph.D. and work as an assistant in botany under Rollins A. Emerson and Lester W. Sharp. He then studied cytology with Lester in the Botany Department and minored in Plant Breeding with Emerson.

In 1920, he attend the meetings of the American Association for the Advancement of Science in Chicago, and presented a paper to the American Naturalist Division on 'A case of maternal inheritance in Maize: Cytological Relations'. He is a member of the Association and of the Botanical Society of America.

In 1907, Herbert J. Webber started the Synapsis Club, a student/faculty organization at Cornell, Emerson continued the club and encouraged his students to become members, including Randolph. He also became a member of the Gamma Alpha Graduate Scientific Fraternity and of the Cornell Biological Society.

In 1921, he obtained his Ph.D. degree, in the botany department.

== Career ==
Randolph began working as a teaching assistant under Sharp in the winter term of 1922. He also was an instructor in botany until 1923.

In September 1924, Barbara McClintock (a 2nd year graduate), started worked as a research assistant to Randolph, as well as a working as a teaching assistant to Sharp. They then started to apply the smear technique to pollen cells of corn and hypothesized the origin of polyploidy in Maize. Randolph and McClintock's study techniques were very different. Randolph was very careful, cautious and meticulous, where as McClintock liked to try out and modify new techniques. This resulted in friction between the two that would eventually result in the end of their working relationship. Randolph ended their collaboration and McClintock began to work under Sharp, who gave her more freedom. In 1926, he reported their findings at the 1926 International Botanical Congress at Cornell.

In the early 1930s, 2 technical assistants to Randolph were paid by the USDA, to maintain the stock collecting of the maize fields and assist in hand pollination. He and his students at Cornell started following up on the work on chromosome studies of garden irises by Marc Simonet at the Genetic Institute at Versailles, France in 1930s.

But he stilled carried on his maize research, and in 1932, he published 'Some effects of high temperature on polyploidy and other variations in Maize', in Genetics Vol.18 on page 222–229.(page656) Then in 1936, he published 'Developmental morphology of the caryopsis in maize' in J. Agric. Res. Vol.53 (pages 881–916).

Randolph and his wife Fannie made several trips to Europe collecting irises. They travelled to England (between 1936 and 1939, also in 1950 and 1959), France (in 1950 and 1954), Denmark (in 1950), and Sweden (in 1950). He also led expeditions in search of new forms of iris, including Iris pumila.

In a complaint letter to Marcus Morton Rhoades (Editor of Genetics journal) in 1942, he criticised Barbara McClintock's editing the work of a pupil of Randolph's. Calling her a prima donna, who wants to be the goddess of science and godmother to aspiring young scientists everywhere.

After World War II, he began to study corn seed that had been exposed to atomic radiation at Bikini Atoll, in the Pacific Ocean. he then published the results in the Science Journal.

He was appointed chairman of the Scientific Committee of the American Iris Society, between 1945, and 1946. He started the counting of chromosomes of iris, growing seeds in vitro and classification of the genus.

He was still president of the Cornell College chapters of Phi Kappa Phi (between 1947 and 1948) and Sigma Xi (between 1953 and 1954).

He also collected with Efraim Ildefonso Hernández-Xolocotzi Guzman (1913–1991) in Mexico for the Natural History Museum and Grey Herbarium. Finding and publishing Tripsacum zopilotense Hernandez-Xolocotzi, E. & Randolph, L.F. in 1950, in Guerrero, Mexico.

In 1954, he went to Europe and the Middle East on an iris hunting field trip, which included Switzerland, France, Italy, Yugoslavia, Germany, Austria, Cypress, Turkey, Lebanon, and Egypt.

During 1956 and 1959, he was made Membership Chairman for American Iris Society (AIS).

He then spent six months in 1957–58 at Aligarh Muslim University in India with a Fulbright Award, as a consultant on embryo culture.

In 1959, he wrote and had published Garden Irises, which has 575 pages. Within the book, the chapter, 'Chromosomes of Garden varieties of Bearded Iris',(pages315-324) showed his academic interest. He also re-organised the William Dykes classification of irises, by moving certain irises into different sections and subgenra. This classification is still used by the American Iris Society.

He served as the vice president and then became the 9th, President of the American Iris Society from 1960 to 1962. Randolph and his wife, kept an extensive collection of iris in his garden at their home in Ithaca, which attracted many visitors.

He was not only interested in irises but also orchids, specifically the genus Dendrobium. In 1960, T. Vajrabhaya and Randolph published 'Chromosome studies in Dendrobium' in Amer. Orchid Soc. Bull. Vol.29 (pages 507–517).

After nearly 40 years at Cornell, he retired in 1961, but started working part-time during the winters, at the Fairchild Tropical Garden, in Miami, Florida as a research collaborator. Including work on Tripsacum grasses, which he imported from Mexico and Guatemala. He then spent his summers back home at Ithaca. He also started working on the evolutionary history of maize.

In 1966, Iris nelsonii was first published and described by Randolph in 'Baileya' (a Quarterly Journal of Horticultural Taxonomy of Ithaca, NY) 14: 150 in 1966. The species was named after Ira S. "Ike" Nelson, professor of horticulture at the University of Louisiana, Lafayette, and one of the founders, and early show managers, of the Society for Louisiana Irises. Nelson collaborated with Randolph, and together they identified Iris nelsonii, and Randolph named it after Nelson.

In 1967, Randolph, I.S. Nelson and R.L. Plaisted published 'Negative evidence of introgression affecting the stability of Louisiana Iris species' Cornell Univ Ag. Exp. Station Mem. Vol.398 (pages 1–56). This paper reviewed the morphological and pollen fertility data collected for Iris fulva, Iris brevicaulis and Iris hexagona and other hybrid iris populations. He concluded that between the Louisiana iris species was localized hybridization.

In 1976, he published 'Contributions of wild relatives of maize to the evolutionary history of domesticated maize: a synthesis of divergent hypotheses in Economic Botany, Vol.30 (pages321-345), which discounted the role of teosinte as an ancestor of maize.

Lowell died in Ithaca in 1980.

== Awards and honours ==
He was award many honours including;

- The Randolph-Perry Medal, this is the highest award given by the American Iris Society, started in 2000 and is restricted to species hybrid Irises. It was named after Dr Randolph and Amos Perry (1871-1953), (Father-in-law of Frances Perry) and a British nurserymen and iris hybridizer, and the winner of the first ever Dykes Medal, named after William Rickatson Dykes.

== Personal life ==
He married a fellow Cornell graduate student in botany, Fannie C. Rane in 1922. She got her MS degree in botany in 1923.

They settled in Ithaca, and brought up three children. Robert Fitz Randolph (later of Manlius), on 20 December 1927, Elizabeth Jane (Randolph) DeMott (later of Herndon, Virginia,) and Rane Fitz Randolph.

They also had nine grandchildren.

His daughter, Elizabeth Jane DeMott died on 16 March 2009, after her brother Rane had died.

== Selected publications about Irises ==
- Randolph, L. F., (1934), Bulletin of the American Iris Society 52: 61–66.
- Randolph, L. F., (1947), Bulletin of the American Iris Society 107: 67–78.
- Randolph, L. F., (1955), The Geographic Distribution of European and Eastern Mediterranean Species of Bearded Iris, The Iris Year Book 1955, p. 35-46.
- Randolph, L. F., (1956), Crossability of bearded iris species. Bulletin of the American Iris Society No. 140: p. 24-31. 50–60.
- Randolph, L. F., (editor), Garden Irises (1959), American Iris Society.
- Randolph, L. F., (1957), "More medans". Bulletin of the American Iris Society No. 144: p. 10-24. January, 1957. Illustrations of I. rubromarginata, I. aphylla, I. bosniaca, I. chamaeiris.
- Randolph, L. F., (1957), Cytogenetics of Median bearded Irises. Bulletin of the American Iris Society No. 145: p. 1-8. April, 1957. I. attica 'Parnes'.
- Randolph, L. F., (1959), "Karyotypes of Iris species." American Journal of Botany 46, 2.
- Randolph, L. F., (1966),'Iris nelsonii' in Baileya 14:143 (1966), New York.
- Randolph, L. F., & Fannie Randolph, (1959), Collecting Irises Abroad, Bulletin of the American Iris Society No. 155, p5-11, July, 1961.
- Randolph, L. F., & F. Randolph, (1961), Collecting Iris Species in Europe, Bulletin of the American Iris Society No. 162, p37-39, July, 1961.
- Randolph, L. F., & Katherine Heinig, (1953), Chromosome Studies of Dwarf Iris Species and Hybrids, The Iris Year Book 1953. P. 45–52.
- Randolph, L. F., & G. H. Lawrence, (1958), Classification of Eupogon Irises, Bulletin of the American Iris Society No. 148, p. 9-17. January, 1958.
- Randolph, L. F., & Mitra, Jyotirmay, (1956), Chromosome numbers of Iris species. Bulletin of the American Iris Society, No. 140, p. 50-60.
- Randolph, L. F., & Mitra, J., (1959), 'Karyotypes of Iris pumila and related species' in American Journal of Botany 46::93-102. Baltimore.
- Randolph, L. F., & Mitra, J., (1959), Iris Chromosome Numbers, Bulletin of the American Iris Society, No. 152, p. 5-9, January 1959.
- Randolph, L. F., & Mitra, J., (1960), Chromosomes of Aril and Arilbred Irises, Bulletin of the American Iris Society, No. 157, p. 41-60.April 1960.
- Randolph, L. F., & Mitra, J., (1961), 'Karyotypes of Iris species indigenous to the USSR . American Journal of Botany. 48, 10.
- Randolph, L. F., & Mitra, J., (1962), The dwarf bearded Iris hybrids of Goos and Koeneman. Caryolog. 15, 3: 477–483.
