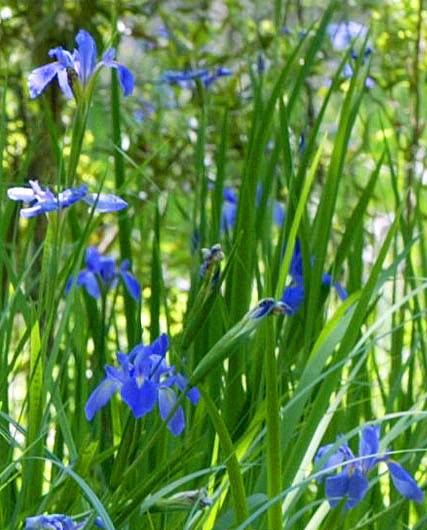
- Wild blue iris blooming in swamp at Barataria Preserve, Louisiana

Conservation status
- Vulnerable (NatureServe)

Scientific classification
- Kingdom: Plantae
- Clade: Tracheophytes
- Clade: Angiosperms
- Clade: Monocots
- Order: Asparagales
- Family: Iridaceae
- Genus: Iris
- Subgenus: Iris subg. Limniris
- Section: Iris sect. Limniris
- Series: Iris ser. Hexagonae
- Species: I. giganticaerulea

Binomial name
- Iris giganticaerulea Small

Synonyms
- Iris aurilinea Alexander; Iris citricristata Small; Iris elephantina Small; Iris fluviatilis Small; Iris hexagona var. giganticaerulea (Small) R.C.Foster; Iris miraculosa Small; Iris venulosa Alexander; Iris wherryana Small; Limniris giganticaerulea (Small) Rodion.

= Iris giganticaerulea =

Species of flowering plant

Iris giganticaerulea, the giant blue iris, or Louisiana Iris, is a species of iris, in the subgenus Limniris, in the series Hexagonae. It is a rhizomatous perennial, from northern America. It has long bright green leaves, very tall stems and one or two musky fragrant flowers in a range of blue shades (pale, bright, dark, lavender and violet) or rarely white.

== Description ==
Iris giganticaerulea (the giant blue iris) is the largest species of the Louisiana irises.

It has very large green rhizomes, which are between 5 and 12 inches (13 – 30 cm) long and 0.75 to 1.5 inches (2–4 cm) thick. They are shallow rooted, marked with the scars (of the previous seasons) leaves, with many branches, which can form a large clump/colony growing up to 6 x 3 feet (182 x 91 cm).

Rising from the plant's base are four to six bright green leaves, ensiform (sword-shaped) and between 20 and 30 inches (50–76 cm) long, 1.5 inches (4 cm) wide.

It has very tall stems, that can grow between 28 and 71 inches (70–180 cm) tall. They have two or three branches, with one or two terminal flowers rising above the leaves. There may be up to twelve flowers on the plant.

It blooms from early to mid spring, in the UK and America, with musky flowers.

It comes in a range of blue shades, from pale blue, to lavender blue, to bright blue, to dark blue, and to violet blue. Occasionally there is a white form, or yellowish white.

The flowers are generally 5 to 6 inches (13 to 15 cm) across. They have six petals, three outer sepals (called the falls), which are flaring (1.75 inch or 4 cm wide), arch downward and have a white or yellow or faint orange signal patch or ridge. They also have three inner sepals (called the standards), which are slightly erect or upright and narrower than the falls.

It has a 4–5 cm long perianth tube, blue-violet style 1.3–1.5 inch (3.5–4 cm long) and two-lobed stigmae.

After flowering, it has bright green ellipsoid capsules 3–4 inches (7–10 cm) long by 1 inch (3 cm) wide, which are hexagonal in cross section and shaped like a D.

=== Genetics ===
As most irises are diploid, they have two sets of chromosomes. This fact can be used to identify hybrids and classification of groupings. It has a chromosome count of 2n=44. It has been counted several times 2n=44, Randolph 1934 (ex Randolph & Mitra in Bulletin of the American Iris Society 140, in 1956) 2n=44 Riley 1942, 2n=42, R C Foster 1937 (as Iris hexagona var. giganticaerulea) and 2n=44, Randolph, 1966.

== Taxonomy ==
It has the common name of Giant blue iris, or Giant blue flag. Note, the blue flag is normally Iris virginica.

It was first published and described by Small (of the New York Botanical Garden,) in 'Addisonia' in 1929.

In 1937, Foster thought that it was a variety of Iris hexagona and renamed it Iris hexagona var. giganticaerulea. In 1966, Randolph re-assessed it and classified it as a separate species.

Between 1950 and 1990, a large argument was waged over the state flower of Louisiana. Then a compromise was reached whereby the southern magnolia became the state flower and the giant blue iris the state wildflower.

It was verified by United States Department of Agriculture and the Agricultural Research Service on 4 April 2003, and then updated on 2 December 2004.

== Distribution and habitat ==
It is native to northern America.

=== Range ===
Iris giganticaerulea is native to Alabama, Louisiana, (on the west edge of Mississippi River), eastern Texas, and Mississippi in the United States.

This constricted range is due to limited hardiness of the species.

It grows in shallow freshwater, within roadside ditches, clearings within swamps (including cypress swamps,), wet meadows and marshes. It is tolerant of brackish water.

== Cultivation ==
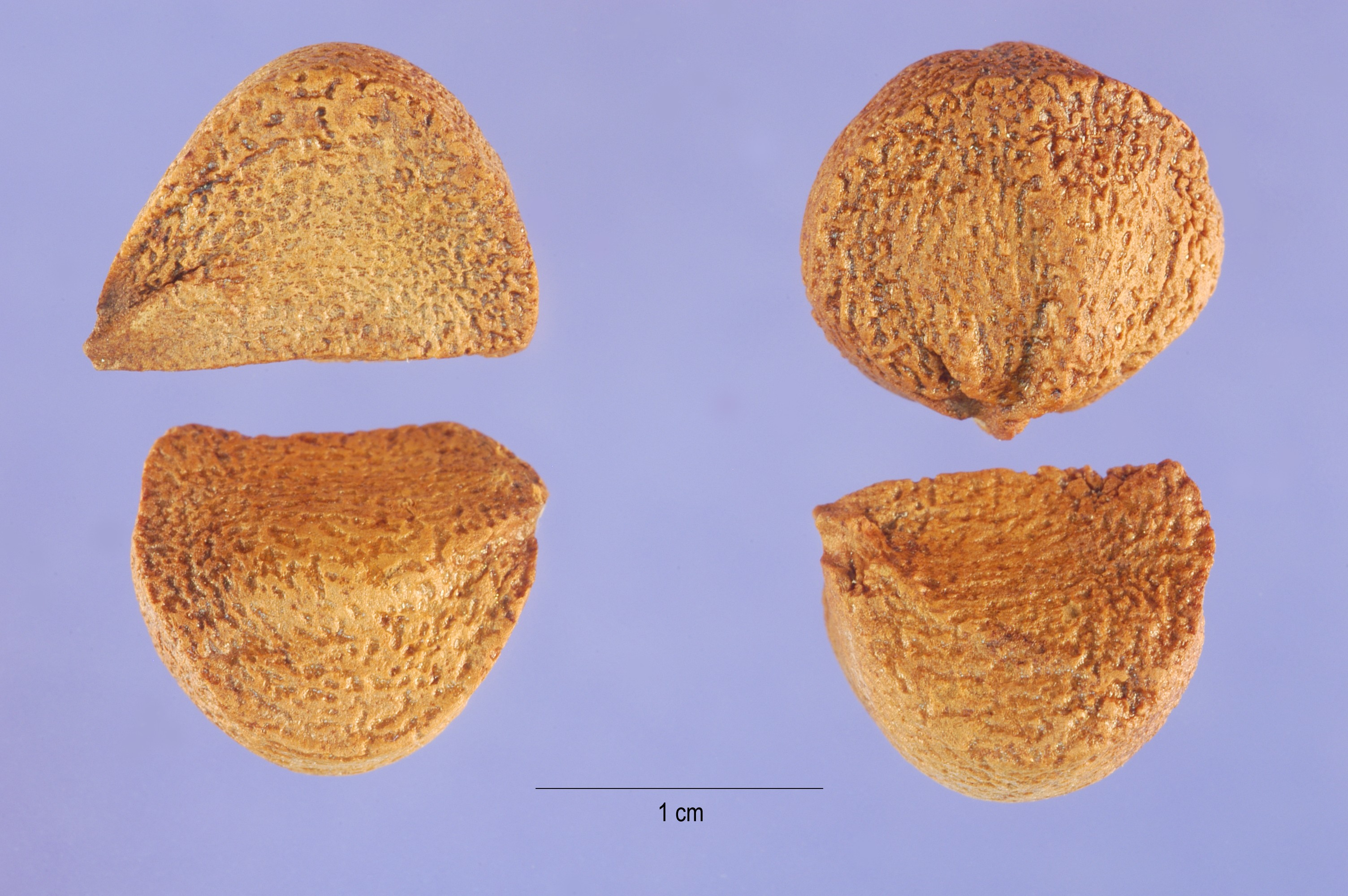
Giant Blue Iris Seeds

The Louisiana irises generally all have similar cultivation requirements, with minor differences. They need full sunlight or partial shade, moist, acidic soils (ph level of 6.5) with a high organic and high fertility content (or humus rich).

For best flowering, moisture is essential during late autumn, winter and spring times (between October and May), when the plant starts to grow new leaves. They can be given a light feed between autumn and spring, if needed.

Propagation is best carried out by division of the rhizomes. Which is best carried out in early autumn or early spring, when the plants are dormant. The ground must be prepared pre-planting, with the addition of a generous amount of organic matter and the soils dug to about 6 inches deep (to allow for new root growth). Plants require dividing every 3–4 years to promote good flowering. They can combine with other plants but tend to 'move' to suitable positions.

If using a fertilizer, sprinkle around the plant in late January or February, before the plant is in flower.

New plantings need to be mulched to prevent sun-scalding. It is also recommended to be added to during winter.

The iris seed is not hard to raise but a very slow process. It can take many months to germinate (between 3 and 12 months) with a 50% germination average. They then can take 3–5 years before reaching flowering stage.

Seeds should be harvested from the plant after flowering but they must be from mature seed pods. They then should be stored in paper bags, as seed stored in glass containers often goes mouldy.

Iris giganticaerulea and Iris hexagona are considered too tender for cultivation in the UK. Since it needs moist acid soils, with warm summers and milder winters.

It is hardy to USDA Zone 7 to 11 (or 5 and 6 if protected during the winter).

It is often available at water garden centres.

== Hybrids ==
Iris giganticaerulea can easily hybridize with other Louisiana irises to create new variants.

Several American garden nurseries and plant breeders have created many Iris giganticaerulea cultivars including, 'Angel Wings', 'Atrocyanea', 'Barbara Elaine Taylor', 'Bayou Barataria', 'Bayou Boeuf', 'Bayou St John', 'Bette Lee', 'Billy Mac', 'Biloxi', 'Cameron White', 'China Blue', 'Citricristata', 'Citricristata Alba', 'Citriviola', 'Coteau Holmes', 'Creole Can-Can', 'Easter Surprise', 'Elephantina', 'Excitement', 'Florence Zacharie', 'Gentilly Road', 'Gheen's White', 'Giganticaerulea Alba', 'Giganticaerulea Royal', 'Gulf Mist', 'Her Highness', 'High Hat', 'Iberville', 'Isle Bonne', 'Joe Mac', 'Kildea', 'La Bahia ', 'Lafitte', 'La Premiere', 'Laughing Water', 'Lazy Day', 'Longfellow's Gabriel', 'Mandeville', 'Miraculosa', 'Paludicola', 'Ruth Holleyman', 'Silverblu ', 'Snow Flag', 'Snow Goose', 'Southern Accent','Spanish Fort', 'Trixie'.

Other crosses include with Iris fulva to produce 'Iris × vinicolor' Small.

== Sources ==
- British Iris Society, A Guide to Species Irises: Their Identification and Cultivation (1997)
