= Addisonia (journal) =

Journal published by the New York Botanical Garden

Addisonia is an illustrated journal covering botanical and horticultural subjects, published by the New York Botanical Garden from 1916 to 1964.

== History ==
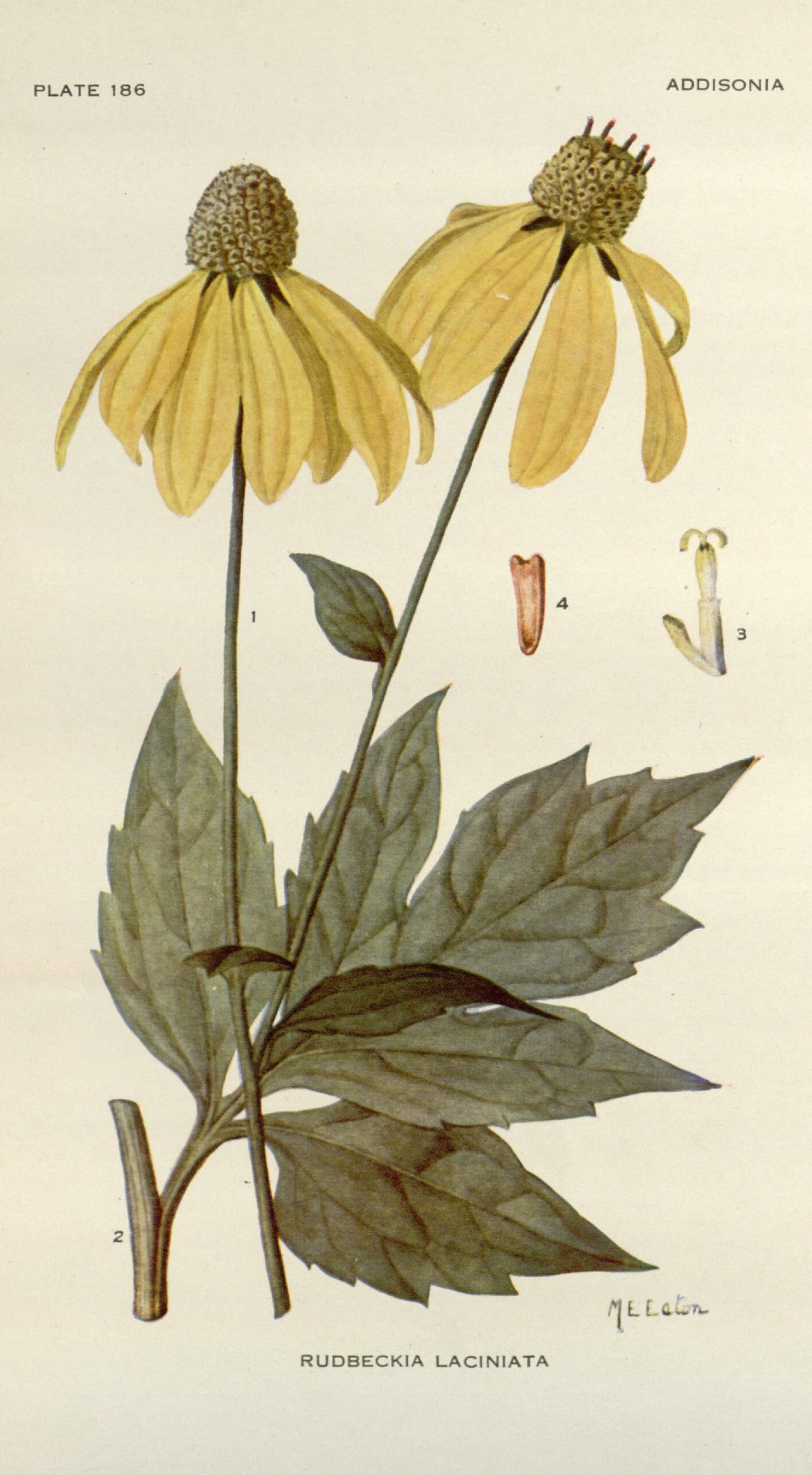
Illustration of Rudbeckia laciniata in 1920 by Mary Emily Eaton

Addisonia was inaugurated as the result of a bequest by judge Addison Brown, who was a co-founder of the New York Botanical Garden. The magazine was to be devoted exclusively to vascular plants from the United States and its territorial possessions or flowering in the New York Botanical Garden or its conservatories. The first editors of Addisonia were the botanist John Hendley Barnhart and George Valentine Nash, the Botanical Garden's head gardener at the time. Later editors included Henry Gleason and Edward Johnston Alexander.

Originally published as a quarterly, various factors caused the publication schedule to lengthen over time. Beginning with volume 18 in 1933–34, the magazine became semi-annual; with volume 21 (1939) it became an annual. By the last few years, issues were being printed irregularly as sufficient funds became available. The cover price of $10 remained unchanged over the magazine's 50-year history.

In its first five years, Addisonia covered such diverse topics as acacias, dwarf polyantha roses, and cacti. New York Botanical Garden staff illustrator Mary Emily Eaton was the magazine's principal illustrator in its first three decades, creating over three-quarters of its 800 plates.

Addisonia is still considered a valuable reference work and teaching aid for the high quality of its illustrations, the detailed plant descriptions by well-known authorities, and the care taken to provide bibliographical citations. During its existence, Addisonia reported on three new genera and 31 new species.
