= History of plant breeding =

Techniques to change plant traits

Plant breeding started with sedentary agriculture, particularly the domestication of the first agricultural plants, a practice which is estimated to date back 9,000 to 11,000 years. Initially, early human farmers selected food plants with particular desirable characteristics and used these as a seed source for subsequent generations, resulting in an accumulation of characteristics over time. In time however, experiments began with deliberate hybridization, the science and understanding of which was greatly enhanced by the work of Gregor Mendel. Mendel's work ultimately led to the new science of genetics. Modern plant breeding is applied genetics, but its scientific basis is broader, covering molecular biology, cytology, systematics, physiology, pathology, entomology, chemistry, and statistics (biometrics). It has also developed its own technology. Plant breeding efforts are divided into a number of different historical landmarks.

== Early plant breeding ==
=== Domestication ===
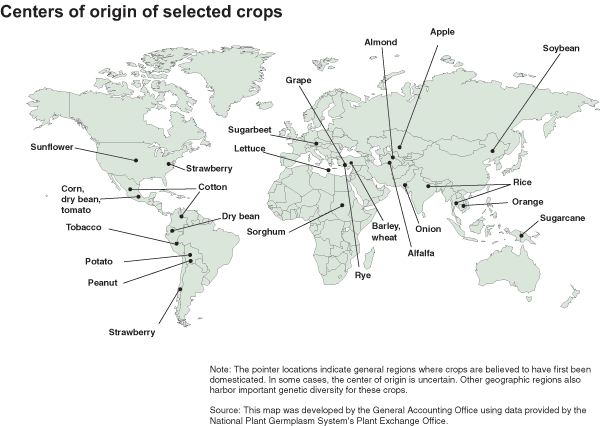
This map shows the sites of domestication for a number of crops. Places where crops were initially domesticated are called centers of origin

Domestication of plants is an artificial selection process conducted by humans to produce plants that have more desirable traits than wild plants, and which renders them dependent on artificial usually enhanced environments for their continued existence. The practice is estimated to date back 9,000–11,000 years. Many crops in present-day cultivation are the result of domestication in ancient times, about 5,000 years ago in the Old World and 3,000 years ago in the New World. In the Neolithic period, domestication took a minimum of 1,000 years and a maximum of 7,000 years. Today, all principal food crops come from domesticated varieties. Almost all the domesticated plants used today for food and agriculture were domesticated in the centers of origin. In these centers there is still a great diversity of closely related wild plants, so-called crop wild relatives, that can also be used for improving modern cultivars by plant breeding.

A plant whose origin or selection is due primarily to intentional human activity is called a cultigen, and a cultivated crop species that has evolved from wild populations due to selective pressures from traditional farmers is called a landrace. Landraces, which can be the result of natural forces or domestication, are plants or animals that are suited to a particular region or environment.

In some cases, such as rice, different subspecies were domesticated in different regions; Oryza sativa subspecies indica was domesticated in South Asia, while Oryza sativa subspecies japonica was developed in China.

For more on the mechanisms of domestication, see Hybrid (biology).

=== Columbian Exchange ===
Humans have traded useful plants from distant lands for centuries, and plant hunters have been sent to bring plants back for cultivation. Human agriculture has had two important results: the plants most favoured by humans came to be grown in many places and (2) gardens and farms have provided some opportunities for plants to interbreed that would not have been possible for their wild ancestors. Columbus's arrival in America in 1492 triggered unprecedented transfer of plant resources between Europe and the New World.

== Scientific plant breeding ==
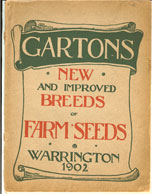
Garton's catalogue from 1902

Thomas Fairchild (? 1667 – 10 October 1729) was an English gardener, "the leading nurseryman of his day", working in London. He corresponded with Carl Linnæus, and helped by experiments to establish the existence of sex in plants. In 1716–17 (the cross made in summer 1716, the new plant appearing the next spring) he was the first person to scientifically produce an artificial hybrid, Dianthus Caryophyllus barbatus, known as "Fairchild's Mule", a cross between a Sweet william and a Carnation pink.

Gregor Mendel's experiments with plant hybridization led to his laws of inheritance. This work became well known in the 1900s and formed the basis of the new science of genetics, which stimulated research by many plant scientists dedicated to improving crop production through plant breeding.

However, successful commercial plant breeding concerns began to be founded from the late 19th century. Gartons Agricultural Plant Breeders in England was established in the 1890s by John Garton, who was one of the first to cross-pollinate agricultural plants and commercialize the newly created varieties. He began experimenting with the artificial cross pollination firstly of cereal plants, then herbage species and root crops and developed far reaching techniques in plant breeding.

William Farrer revolutionized wheat farming in Australia with the widespread release in 1903 of the fungus resistant "Federation" strain of wheat, which was developed as a result of his plant breeding work over a period of twenty years using Mendel's theories.

From 1904 to World War II in Italy, Nazareno Strampelli created a number of wheat hybrids. His work allowed Italy to increase crop production during the so-called "Battle for Grain" (1925–1940) and some varieties were exported to foreign countries, such as Argentina, Mexico, and China. Strampelli's work laid the foundations for Norman Borlaug and the Green Revolution.

=== Green revolution ===
In 1908, George Harrison Shull described heterosis, also known as hybrid vigor. Heterosis describes the tendency of the progeny of a specific cross to outperform both parents. The detection of the usefulness of heterosis for plant breeding has led to the development of inbred lines that reveal a heterotic yield advantage when they are crossed. Maize was the first species where heterosis was widely used to produce hybrids.

By the 1920s, statistical methods were developed to analyze gene action and distinguish heritable variation from variation caused by environment. In 1933 another important breeding technique, cytoplasmic male sterility (CMS), developed in maize, was described by Marcus Morton Rhoades. CMS is a maternally inherited trait that makes the plant produce sterile pollen. This enables the production of hybrids without the need for labor-intensive detasseling.

These early breeding techniques resulted in large yield increases in the United States in the early 20th century. Similar yield increases were not produced elsewhere until after World War II, the Green Revolution increased crop production in the developing world in the 1960s. This remarkable improvement was based on three essential crops. First came the development of hybrid maize, then high-yielding and input-responsive "semi-dwarf wheat" (for which the CIMMYT breeder N.E. Borlaug received the Nobel prize for peace in 1970), and third came high-yielding "short statured rice" cultivars. Similarly notable improvements were achieved in other crops like sorghum and alfalfa.

=== Molecular genetics and bio-revolution ===
Intensive research in molecular genetics has led to the development of recombinant DNA technology (popularly called genetic engineering). Advancement in biotechnological techniques has opened many possibilities for breeding crops. Thus, while Mendelian genetics allowed plant breeders to perform genetic transformations in a few crops, molecular genetics has provided the key to both the manipulation of the internal genetic structure, and the "crafting" of new cultivars according to a pre-determined plan.

=== DNA repair and recombination in crop improvement ===
Most approaches to crop improvement, including conventional breeding, genome modification and gene editing, rely primarily on the fundamental processes of DNA repair and recombination. Our current understanding of DNA repair and recombination mechanisms in plants was derived largely from prior studies in prokaryotes, yeast and animals, so that our present knowledge remains rooted in this history. This approach has led to gaps in our understanding of the basic processes of DNA repair and recombination in plants so that further progress in this area of plant research should contribute to significant crop improvement.

== See also ==
- The breeding of strawberries
- Marker-assisted selection
