= Franklin David Keim =

American plant geneticist (1886–1956)

- Born: September 10, 1886; Hardy, Nebraska, U.S
- Died: March 7, 1956 (aged 69); Washington, D.C.
- Education: University of Nebraska, Cornell University
- Spouse: Alice Mary Voigt
- Children: 2
- Awards: ASA Fellow
- Scientific career
- Workplaces: University of Nebraska
- Thesis: "Inheritance studies of a cross between T. compactum and T. spelta" (1927)
- Doctoral advisor: Harry Houser Love
- Notable students: George Beadle, George F. Sprague

Franklin David Keim (1886-1956) was a professor at the University of Nebraska where he studied plant genetics, grasses, and grazing. He served as the chair of the University of Nebraska Department of Agronomy for 22 years from 1930 to 1952. He was elected a fellow of the American Society of Agronomy in 1937 and served as the president of the American Society of Agronomy in 1943. The University of Nebraska's Keim Hall is named in his honor.

== Early life and education ==
Keim was born on September 10, 1886, in Hardy, Nebraska. He attended Bethany College in 1904 and received a teacher's certificate from Peru State College in 1909. He worked as a principal for several years before moving to Lincoln, Nebraska, to attend the University of Nebraska. He earned his bachelor's degree in 1914 and a master's degree in 1918. During his time as a student he meet Rollins A. Emerson prior to Emerson's move from Nebraska to Cornell University. He married his wife Alice Mary Voigt in 1914. They had two children, Virginia Voigt Honstead and Wayne Franklin Keim. Wayne ultimately also became an agronomist, professor, and chair of the department of agronomy at Colorado State University.

== Career ==
After completing his bachelor's, Keim worked at the University of Nebraska as an extension agronomist. After completing his master's degree, he became a professor in the Department of Agronomy. Keim's interest in plant genetics lead him to pursue a PhD with Emerson, now at Cornell. He employed sabbaticals and annual leaves to earn a PhD from Emerson at Cornell while continuing to serve as a faculty member at the University of Nebraska, completing his PhD in 1927. In 1930 he became the chair of the Agronomy department, a position held for the next twenty-two years. During his time as chair the size of the department doubled and he built connections with the USDA with federal government researchers stationed at and working within the department. From 1945 to 1946 he was sent to France to teach plant genetics and agronomy to US army soldiers waiting to return home from the war at Biarritz American University. Upon Keim's death in 1956, the building that housed the Agronomy department was renamed Keim Hall in his honor.

In 1934 he published Common Grass Weeds of Nebraska.

== Mentoring ==
- George F. Sprague, undergraduate mentee, National Academy of Sciences member
- George Beadle, masters mentee, National Academy of Sciences member, Nobel Prize winner
