= Mother's curse =

In biology, mother's curse is an evolutionary effect that males inherit deleterious mitochondrial genome (mtDNA) mutations from their mother, while those mutations are beneficial, neutral or less deleterious to females.

As mtDNA is usually maternally inherited, mtDNA mutations deleterious to males but beneficial, neutral or less deleterious to females are not subjected to be selected against, which results in a sex-biased selective sieve. Therefore, male-specific deleterious mtDNA mutations could be maintained and reach a high frequency in populations, decreasing males' fitness and population viability. In addition, the effect of mtDNA mutations on fitness has a threshold effect, i.e. only when the number of mutation reaches the threshold, mtDNA mutations will decrease individual fitness.

Males are more susceptible to mtDNA defects, not only because of lack of selection for mtDNA on males but also due to sperm's higher energy requirements for motility. There are evidence showing mtDNA mutations are more likely to affect males. In humans, Leber's hereditary optic neuropathy (LHON) is caused by one or several point mutations on mtDNA and LHON affects more males than females. In mice, a deletion on mtDNA causes oligospermia and asthenozoospermia, resulting in infertility. Taken together, mtDNA mutations pose a greater threat on males than on females.

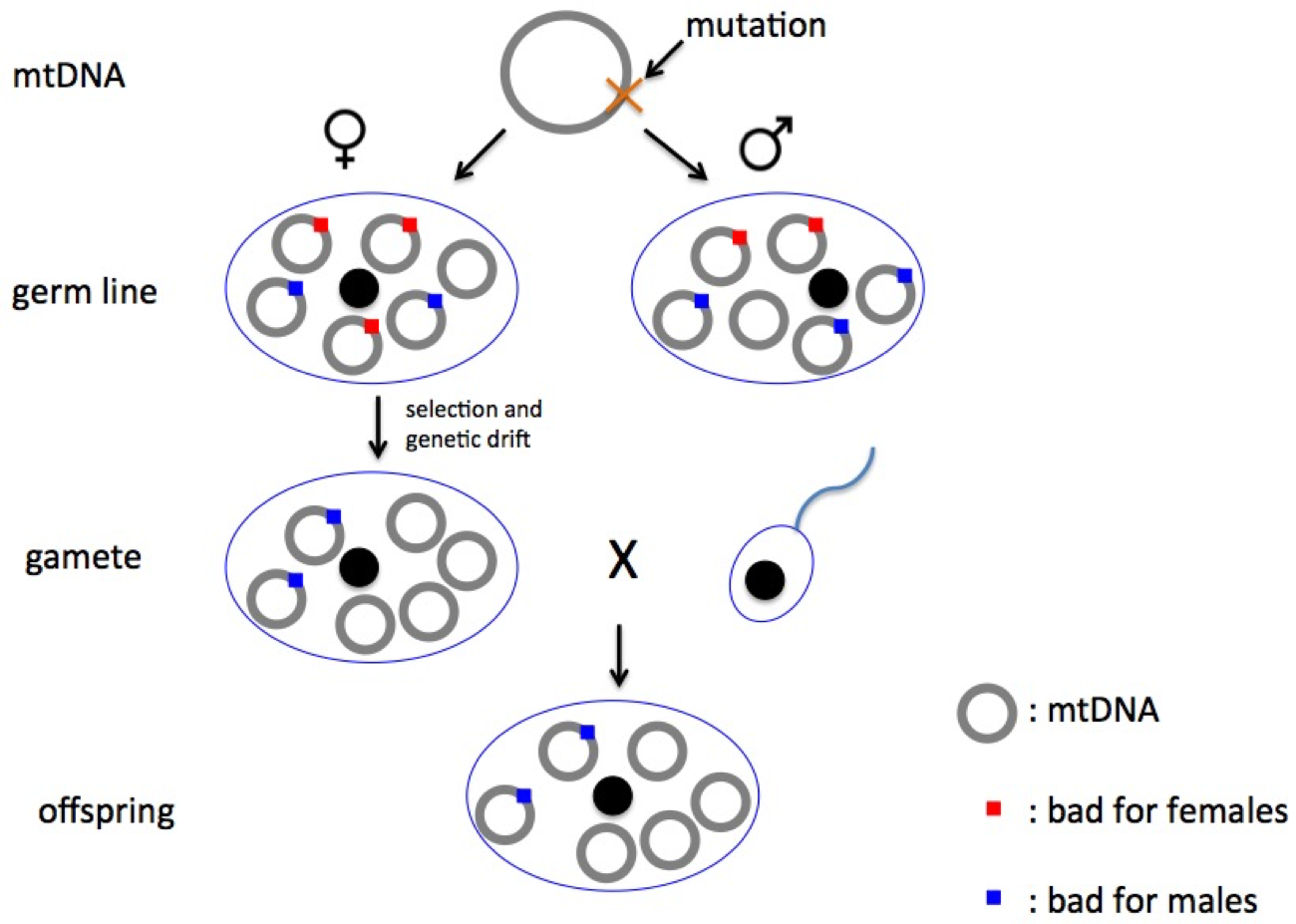
The process showing how mother's curse occurs. mtDNA mutates and generates copies that are detrimental for females (red) and copies that only detrimental for males (blue). Mitochondria bad for females are selected against, while mitochondria only bad for males are transmitted to the offspring. As a result, the males of offspring who inherit bad mutations would have a lower fitness.

== Evidence ==
Mother's curse predicts that mtDNA mutations pose a greater threat on males and male-specific detrimental mutations in mtDNA could be maintained and reach a high frequency. Several researches support these predictions. In humans, a mtDNA haplogroup that exhibits reduction in sperm mobility reaches a frequency of 20%. A 2017 study found the mother's curse preserving a mutation that causes Leber's hereditary optic neuropathy in a population of French Canadians for over 290 years.

In Drosophila melanogaster, mtDNA polymorphism mainly affects nuclear gene expression in males but not in females and those genes are predominantly male-biased. Moreover, Camus et al. constructed 13 D. melanogaster lines with isogenic nuclear genome and different mtDNA haplotypes. They demonstrated that mtDNA polymorphism is responsible for male aging, while there is no significant effect on female longevity. Smith et al. analyzed two different haplotype of mtDNA in hares and found that males of those two haplogroups show variation in their reproductive success. In addition, the mitochondrial genome is associated with sperm viability and length in seed beetles (Callosobruchus maculatus).

== How to counteract the effects of male-specific deleterious mtDNA mutations ==
If mtDNA mutations deleterious to male fitness could not be selected against, they would reach a high frequency despite the high fitness cost for males. Eventually, detrimental mutations would be fixed and lead to species extinction. However, we have not observed extinction in spite of high mutation load of mtDNA. So there must be ways that species could decrease the effects of male-specific deleterious mtDNA mutations.

- Paternal leakage – Although mtDNA is thought to be exclusively maternally inherited, paternal inheritance exists in a low frequency of 10^{−4} relative to maternal inheritance in mice. Hence, selection can act on male-specific deleterious mutations when they are paternally inherited, decreasing their frequency.
- Interaction between mtDNA and nuclear genome – A good example is cytoplasmic male sterility (CMS). CMS occurs in many plants. mtDNA mutations are responsible for this phenomenon. However, nuclear restorer genes (Rf or Fr) could infer male fertility. Therefore, interaction between mtDNA and nuclear genes could be one of mechanisms that counteract deleterious effects of male-specific mtDNA mutations
- Positive assortative mating and kin selection could also relieve fitness cost of male-specific deleterious mtDNA mutations, while negative assortative mating has an opposite function.

== Significance for evolution ==
Mitochondria play a pivotal role in eukaryotic respiration. Because of maternal inheritance, mtDNA has no selection in males. Instead, mutations only deleterious to males could be maintained and reach a higher frequency by selection or genetic drift in females. As a consequence, asymmetric effects of mtDNA mutations result in sexual conflict. On the other hand, to alleviate the effect of mother's curse, interaction between mtDNA and nuclear genes promotes coevolution of mitochondrial and nuclear genomes.

== See also ==
- Sexual conflict
