= Marcus Morton Rhoades =

American geneticist

- Born: 24 July 1903; Graham, Missouri
- Died: 30 December 1991 (aged 88)
- Education: University of Michigan, Cornell University (Ph.D. 1932)
- Known for: Demonstrating pre-meiotic pairing of homologous chromosomes in maize
- Awards: National Academy of Sciences, American Philosophical Society, American Academy of Arts and Sciences, Foreign Fellow of the Royal Danish Academy of Science and Letters, Thomas Hunt Morgan Medal
- Scientific career
- Fields: Cytogenetics
- Institutions: Cornell University; USDA, Ames, Iowa; Columbia University; University of Illinois; Indiana University
- Doctoral advisor: Rollins A. Emerson
- Doctoral students: Ruth Sager

Marcus Morton Rhoades (July 24, 1903 in Graham, Missouri – December 30, 1991) was an American cytogeneticist.

== Education ==
He earned a Bachelor of Science degree in 1927, a Master of Science degree in 1928 from the University of Michigan and a Ph.D. degree in 1932 from Cornell University where he was a trainee of Rollins A. Emerson alongside future Nobel Prize winners George Beadle and Barbara McClintock, and completed a thesis on the topic of cytoplasmic male sterility in maize.

== Career ==
After completing his doctoral studies, Rhoades's career spanned numerous institutions, first working as an experimentalist in plant breeding at Cornell University from 1932 to 1935, a research geneticist with the USDA in Ames, Iowa and later Arlington, Virginia from 1935 to 1940, an associate professor and later full professor at Columbia University from 1940 to 1948, a professor at the University of Illinois from 1948 to 1958, and finally at Indiana University from 1948 until reaching maximum retirement age in 1974.

He was elected to the United States National Academy of Sciences in 1946, the American Philosophical Society in 1962, and the American Academy of Arts and Sciences in 1966.

Rhoades was active in the Genetics Society of America, serving as the editor of Genetics from 1940 to 1948, and later as the Vice President and then President of the GSA.

His research on maize led to important discoveries for basic genetics and the applied science of plant breeding. He was one of the first cytogenecists to document the pre-meiotic pairing of homologous chromosomes in maize, otherwise referred to as somatic pairing (Singh, 2003), and the first to document an instance of meiotic drive, a Mendelian inheritance caused by preferential segregation of certain versions of homologous chromosomes during meiosis. Rhoades also pioneered work in nuclear-cytoplasmic interactions, demonstrating that mutation of the nuclear gene iojap produced heritable mutations in the genome of chloroplasts which persisted after the nuclear mutation was segregated away.

In 1907, Herbert J. Webber started the Synapsis Club, a student/faculty organization at Cornell University. Prof. Rollins A. Emerson continued and encouraged his students to become members, including Rhoades.

In the 1940s, Rhoades served as the doctoral advisor of geneticist Ruth Sager at Columbia University.

The M. Rhoades Early-Career Award, awarded annually by the maize genetics community for significant contributions to genetics research in maize or related species, was named in honor of Rhoades.

== Awards ==
- 1977 Foreign Fellow of the Royal Danish Academy of Science and Letters
- 1981 Thomas Hunt Morgan Medal - (Genetics Society of America) - inaugural award, shared with Barbara McClintock
