= Muriel Beadle =

American writer (1915-1994)

Muriel Beadle (née McClure; 1915 - February 13, 1994) was an American journalist and author.

Beadle was born in California in 1915. She graduated from Morgan Park High School, after which she attended Pomona College, ultimately received a bachelor’s degree Phi Beta Kappa. She later received an honorary doctorate from Mundelein College.

Beadle started her career with at Carson Pirie Scott & Co. as an advertising copywriter in the 1930s. She then wrote for the Los Angeles Mirror-News from 1948 to 1958. She published her first book, These Ruins are Inhabited, with Doubleday in 1961. In 1966, she published The Language of Life, which she cowrote with her husband, Nobel Prize-winning geneticist George Beadle. The following year, the book was a finalist for the National Book Award for Science, Philosophy, and religion.

== Published works ==
- These Ruins are Inhabited (Doubleday, 1961)
- The Hyde Park-Kenwood urban renewal years: A history to date (1964)
- The Language of Life: An Introduction to the Science of Genetics, with George Beadle (Doubleday, 1966)
- A Child's Mind: How Children Learn during the Critical Years from Birth to Age Five Years (Methuen, 1971)
- Where Has All the Ivy Gone?: A Memoir of University Life (Doubleday, 1972)
- The Fortnightly of Chicago; the city and its women: 1873-1973 (1973)
- A Nice Neat Operation (Doubleday, 1975)
- The Cat: A Complete Authoritative Compendium of Information About Domestic Cats (Simon and Schuster, 1977)
- Mt. San Antonio Gardens: an informal history, 1953-1986, (1988)
