= George Beadle =

American geneticist (1903–1989)

George Beadle ForMemRS
- Born: George Wells Beadle; October 22, 1903; Wahoo, Nebraska, U.S.
- Died: June 9, 1989 (aged 85); Pomona, California, U.S.
- Education: University of Nebraska (BS); Cornell University (MS, PhD)
- Known for: One gene-one enzyme hypothesis; Gene regulation of biochemical events within cells
- Awards: Albert Lasker Award for Basic Medical Research (1950); Mendel Medal (1958); Nobel Prize in Physiology or Medicine (1958); Thomas Hunt Morgan Medal (1984)
- Scientific career
- Fields: Genetics
- Workplaces: California Institute of Technology; University of Chicago; Harvard University; Stanford University
- Thesis: Genetical and Cytological Studies of Mendelian Asynapsis in Zea mays (1930)
- Doctoral advisor: Rollins A. Emerson; Lester W. Sharp
- Other academic advisors: Franklin D. Keim; Thomas Hunt Morgan (post-doc)
- Doctoral students: Robert Metzenberg
- Other notable students: Norman Horowitz (post-doc); Herschel K. Mitchell (post-doc); William D. McElroy (post-doc); Clement Markert (post-doc)

George Wells Beadle (October 22, 1903 – June 9, 1989) was an American geneticist. In 1958 he shared one-half of the Nobel Prize in Physiology or Medicine with Edward Tatum for their discovery of the role of genes in regulating biochemical events within cells. He served as the 7th president of the University of Chicago from 1961 to 1968.

Beadle and Tatum's key experiments involved exposing the bread mold Neurospora crassa to x-rays, causing mutations. In a series of experiments, they showed that these mutations caused changes in specific enzymes involved in metabolic pathways. These experiments led them to propose a direct link between genes and enzymatic reactions, known as the "One gene-one enzyme hypothesis".

== Early life and education ==
George Wells Beadle was born in Wahoo, Nebraska. He was the son of Chauncey Elmer Beadle and Hattie Albro, who owned and operated a 40-acre (160,000 m^{2}) farm nearby. George was educated at the Wahoo High School and might himself have become a farmer if one of his teachers at school had not directed his mind towards science and persuaded him to go to the College of Agriculture in Lincoln, Nebraska. In 1926 he earned his Bachelor of Science degree at the University of Nebraska and subsequently worked for a year with Professor F.D. Keim, who was studying hybrid wheat. In 1927 he earned his Master of Science degree, and Professor Keim secured for him a post as Teaching Assistant at Cornell University, where he worked, until 1931, with Professors R.A. Emerson and L.W. Sharp on Mendelian asynapsis in Zea mays. For this work he obtained, in 1931, his Doctor of Philosophy degree.

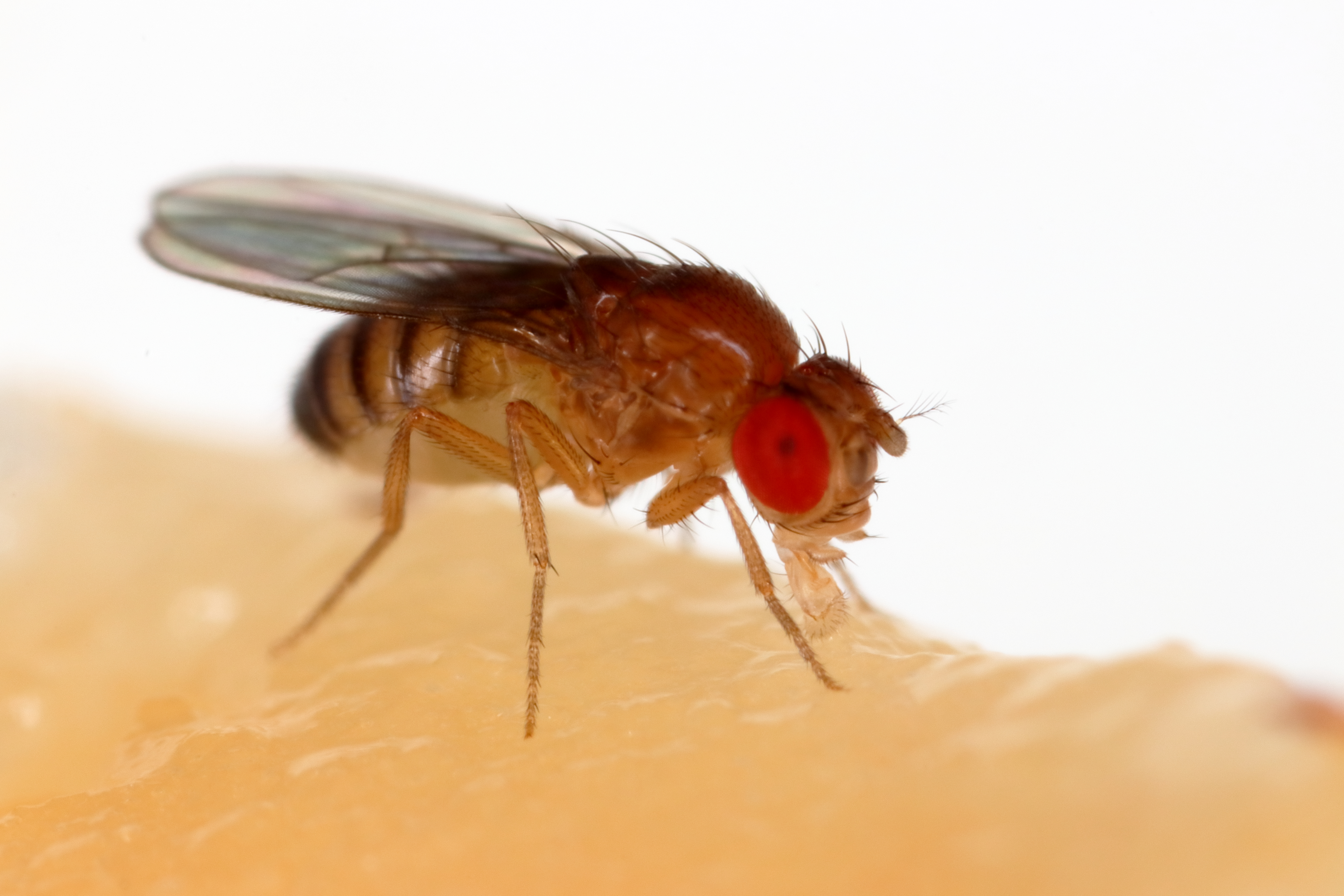
Drosophila Melanogaster, the object of Beadle's science

== Career and research ==
In 1931 Fellowship at the California Institute of Technology at Pasadena, where he remained from 1931 until 1936. During this period he continued his work on Indian corn and began, in collaboration with Professors Theodosius Dobzhansky, S. Emerson, and Alfred Sturtevant, work on crossing-over in the fruit fly, Drosophila melanogaster.

In 1935 Beadle visited Paris for six months to work with Professor Boris Ephrussi at the Institut de Biologie physico-chimique. Together they began the study of the development of eye pigment in Drosophila which later led to the work on the biochemistry of the genetics of the fungus Neurospora for which Beadle and Edward Lawrie Tatum were together awarded the 1958 Nobel Prize for Physiology or Medicine.

In 1936 Beadle left the California Institute of Technology to become assistant professor of genetics at Harvard University. A year later he was appointed Professor of Biology (Genetics) at Stanford University and there he remained for nine years, working for most of this period in collaboration with Tatum. This work of Beadle and Tatum led to an important generalization. This was that most mutants unable to grow on minimal medium, but able to grow on “complete” medium, each require addition of only one particular supplement for growth on minimal medium. If the synthesis of a particular nutrient (such as an amino acid or vitamin) was disrupted by mutation, that mutant strain could be grown by adding the necessary nutrient to the minimal medium. This finding suggested that most mutations affected only a single metabolic pathway. Further evidence obtained soon after the initial findings tended to show that generally only a single step in the pathway is blocked. Following their first report of three such auxotroph mutants in 1941, Beadle and Tatum used this method to create series of related mutants and determined the order in which amino acids and some other metabolites were synthesized in several metabolic pathways. The obvious inference from these experiments was that each gene mutation affects the activity of a single enzyme. This led directly to the one gene-one enzyme hypothesis, which, with certain qualifications and refinements, has remained essentially valid to the present day. As recalled by Horowitz, the work of Beadle and Tatum also demonstrated that genes have an essential role in biosynthesis. At the time of the experiments (1941), non-geneticists still generally believed that genes governed only trivial biological traits, such as eye color, and bristle arrangement in fruit flies, while basic biochemistry was determined in the cytoplasm by unknown processes. Also, many respected geneticists thought that gene action was far too complicated to be resolved by any simple experiment. Thus Beadle and Tatum brought about a fundamental revolution in our understanding of genetics.

In 1946 Beadle returned to the California Institute of Technology as Professor of Biology and Chairman of the Division of Biology. Here he remained until January 1961 when he was elected Chancellor of the University of Chicago and, in the autumn of the same year, President of this university.

After retiring, Beadle undertook a remarkable experiment in maize genetics. In several laboratories he grew a series of Teosinte/Maize crosses. Then he crossed these progeny with each other. He looked for the rate of appearance of parent phenotypes among this second generation. The vast majority of these plants were intermediate between maize and Teosinte in their features, but about 1 in 500 of the plants were identical to either the parent maize or the parent teosinte. Using the mathematics of Mendelian genetics, he calculated that this showed a difference between maize and teosinte of about 5 or 6 genetic loci. This demonstration was so compelling that most scientists now agree that Teosinte is the wild progenitor of maize.

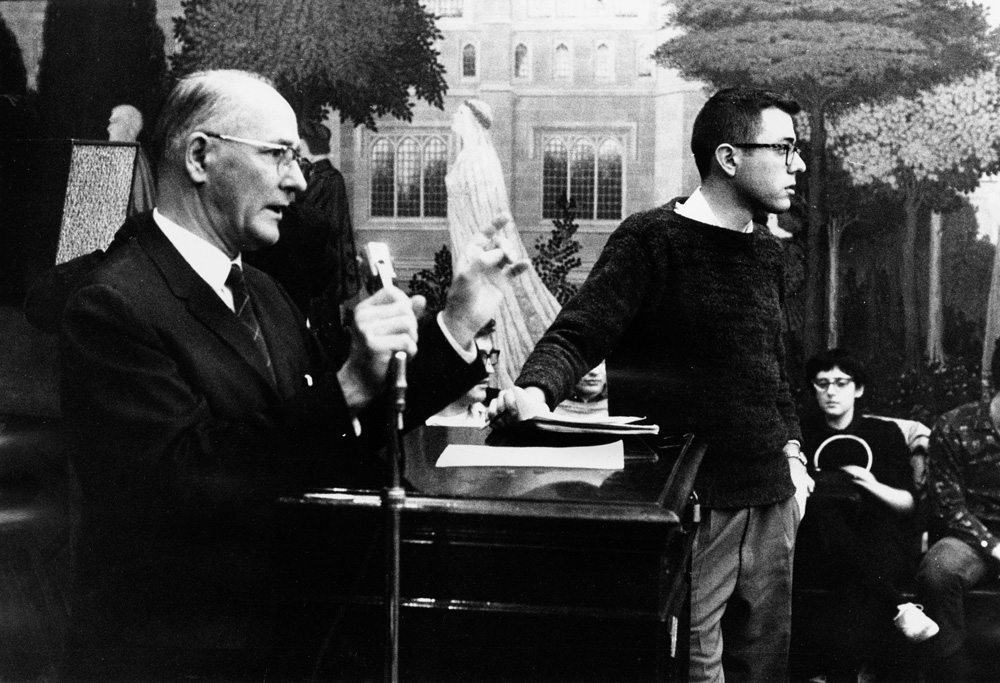
University of Chicago President George Beadle and then-student Bernie Sanders at the CORE meeting on housing sit-ins in Ida Noyes Hall, February 1962

During his career, Beadle received many honors. These included honorary Doctor of Science degrees from Yale (1947), Nebraska (1949), Northwestern University (1952), Rutgers University (1954), Kenyon College (1955), Wesleyan University (1956), the University of Birmingham and the University of Oxford, England (1959), Pomona College (1961), and Lake Forest College (1962). In 1962 he was also given the honorary degree of LL.D. by the University of California, Los Angeles. He was elected a Fellow of the American Academy of Arts and Sciences in 1946. He also received the Lasker Award of the American Public Health Association (1950), the Dyer Award (1951), the Emil Christian Hansen Prize of Denmark (1953), the Albert Einstein Commemorative Award in Science (1958), the Nobel Prize in Physiology or Medicine 1958 with Edward Tatum and Joshua Lederberg, the National Award of the American Cancer Society (1959), and the Kimber Genetics Award of the National Academy of Sciences (1960).

=== Awards and honors ===
In addition to the Nobel Prize, Beadle received numerous other awards. Beadle was a member of several learned societies, he was a Member of the National Academy of Sciences (and Chairman of Committee on Genetic Effects of Atomic Radiation), the Genetics Society of America (President in 1946), the American Association for the Advancement of Science (President in 1955), the American Cancer Society (Chairman of Scientific Advisory Council), a Foreign Member of the Royal Society (ForMemRS) of London, the Danish Royal Academy of Science and the American Philosophical Society.

The George W. Beadle Award of the Genetics Society of America is named in his honor. George Beadle Middle School in Millard, Nebraska (Part of the Millard Public Schools district) was named after him. It opened in 2001. The Beadle Center, which houses the Department of Biochemistry at the University of Nebraska–Lincoln, is also named after George Beadle.

== Personal life ==
Beadle was married twice. By his first wife he had a son, David, who now lives at The Hague, the Netherlands. His second wife, Muriel McClure (1915–1994), a well-known writer, was born in California. Beadle's chief hobbies were rockclimbing, skiing, and gardening. He is credited with the first ascent of Mount Doonerak in Alaska. He was a member of FarmHouse fraternity while at the University of Nebraska.

Beadle died on June 9, 1989, at a retirement community in Pomona, California from complications of Alzheimer's disease, aged 85. He was an atheist.

Academic offices
| Preceded by Lawrence A. Kimpton | President of the University of Chicago; 1961–1968 | Succeeded by Edward H. Levi |
