= George F. Sprague =

American geneticist

George Frederick Sprague (September 3, 1902 – November 24, 1998) was an American geneticist, maize researcher, faculty member at Iowa State University and the University of Illinois and a researcher at the United States Department of Agriculture. He developed a genetically strong line of maize known as Iowa Stiff Stalk Synthetic. A recipient of the Wolf Prize in Agriculture, he was a fellow of the American Association for the Advancement of Science and a member of the National Academy of Sciences.

== Biography ==
Sprague was born in Crete, Nebraska. He was the son of minister Elmer Ellsworth and Lucy Manville Sprague. After graduating from Lincoln High School, he received an undergraduate degree from the University of Nebraska and a Ph.D. from Cornell University under supervision of Rollins A. Emerson.

Sprague was a professor at Iowa State University. At Iowa State, he realized that open-pollinated corn often has weak roots and stalks. After intermating 16 lines known to have strong stalks and roots, he created Iowa Stiff Stalk Synthetic, still used in corn breeding as of 2008. His techniques took advantage of his belief that good germplasm was crucial to successful breeding.

Leaving Iowa State for the USDA Agricultural Research Service (ARS) in 1958, Sprague led the Corn and Sorghum Investigations Unit. He served as president of the American Society of Agronomy in 1960. He retired from the ARS in 1972 and took a research position at the University of Illinois, where he was employed until 1994. In 1998, he died at his home in Eugene, Oregon.

== Honors ==
Sprague was inducted into the ARS Science Hall of Fame in 1990. He was a fellow of the American Association for the Advancement of Science. He was elected to the National Academy of Sciences and he later chaired the organization's section on applied biology. Sprague shared the 1978 Wolf Prize in Agriculture with plant pathologist John Charles Walker. In 2007, Iowa State University Department of Agronomy established the George F. Sprague Endowed Chair.
