= Uniparental inheritance =

Uniparental inheritance is a non-Mendelian form of inheritance that consists of the transmission of genotypes from one parental type to all progeny. That is, all the genes in offspring will originate from only the mother or only the father. This phenomenon is most commonly observed in eukaryotic organelles such as mitochondria and chloroplasts. This is because such organelles contain their own DNA and are capable of independent mitotic replication that does not endure crossing over with the DNA from another parental type. Although uniparental inheritance is the most common form of inheritance in organelles, there is increased evidence of diversity. Some studies found doubly uniparental inheritance (DUI) and biparental transmission to exist in cells. Evidence suggests that even when there is biparental inheritance, crossing-over doesn't always occur. Furthermore, there is evidence that the form of organelle inheritance varied frequently over time. Uniparental inheritance can be divided into multiple subtypes based on the pathway of inheritance.

== Examples ==
=== Organelles ===
Although most of the eukaryotic sub-cellular parts do not have their own DNA nor are capable of replication independent of the nucleus, there are some exceptions such as mitochondria and chloroplasts. Not only are these organelles capable of independent DNA replication, translation, and transcription, they are commonly known to inherit genes from only one parental type. In the case of mitochondria, maternal inheritance is almost the exclusive form of inheritance. Although, during egg cell fertilization, mitochondria are brought into the fertilized cell both by the egg cell and the sperm, the paternal mitochondria are usually marked with ubiquitin and are later destroyed. Even if they are not destroyed, the DNA's of different mitochondria rarely genetically recombine with one another. Thus, mitochondria in most animals are inherited from the maternal type only.

== History ==
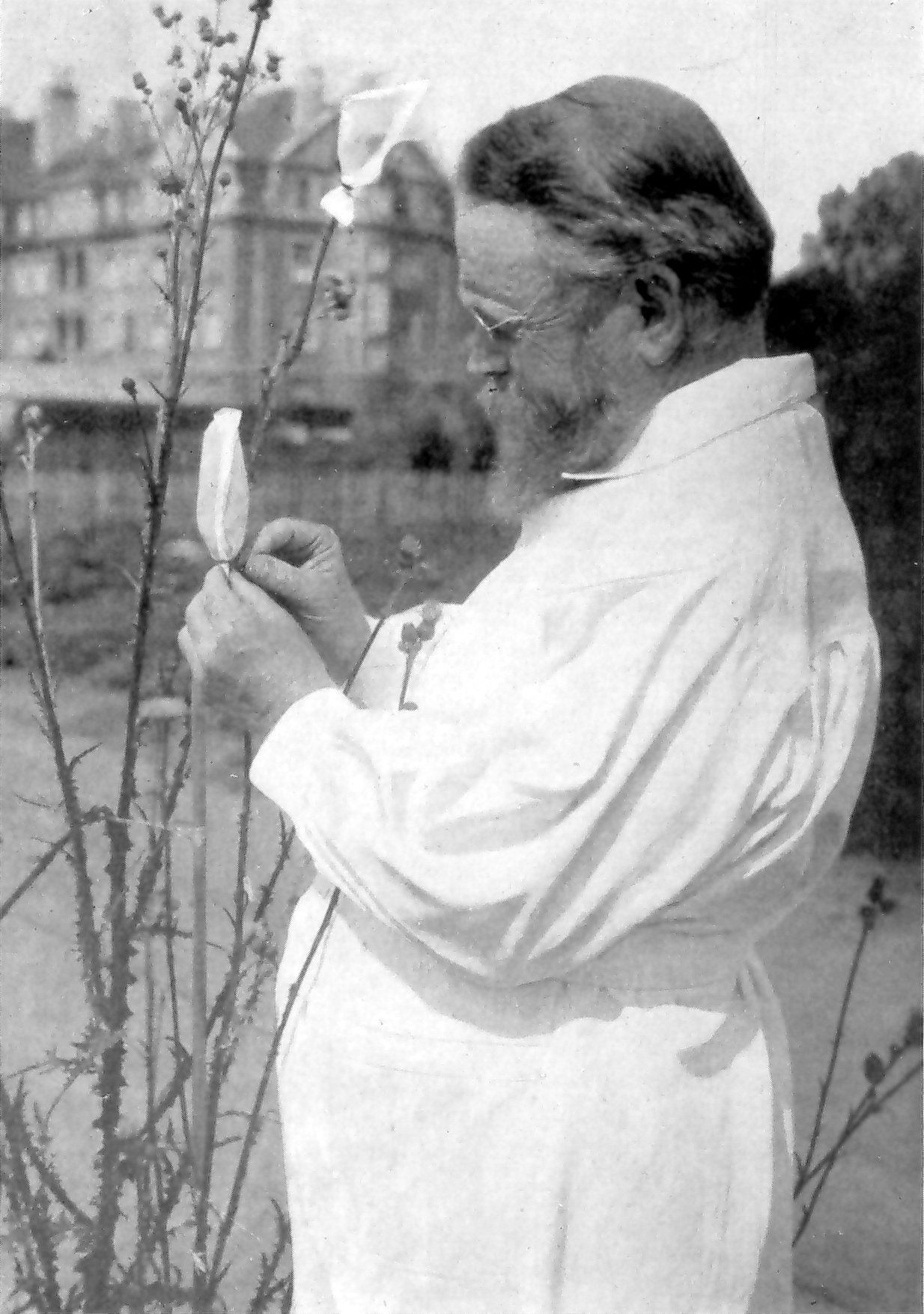
Carl Correns

Like all other genetic concepts, the discovery of uniparental inheritance stems from the days of an Augustinian priest known as Gregor Johann Mendel. The soon-to-be "father of modern genetics" spent his days conducting hybridization experiments on pea plants(Pisum sativum) in his monastery's garden. During a period of seven years (1856 to 1863), Mendel cultivated and tested some 29,000 pea plants which led to him deducing the two famous generalizations known as Mendel's Laws of Heredity. The first, the law of segregation, states that "when any individual produces gametes, the copies of a gene separate, so that each gamete receives only one copy". The second, the law of independent assortment, states that "alleles of different genes assort independently of one another during gamete formation". Although his work was published, it lay dormant until it was rediscovered in 1900 by Hugo de Vries and Carl Correns but it was not until 1909 that non-mendelian inheritance was even suggested. Carl Erich Correns and Erwin Baur, in separately conducted researches on Pelargonium and Mirabilis plants, observed a green-white variation (later found as the result of mutations in the chloroplast genome) that did not follow the Mendelian laws of inheritance. Nearly twenty years later, non-mendelian inheritance of a mitochondrial mutation was also observed and, in the sixties, it was proven that chloroplasts and mitochondria have their own DNA and that they are capable translation, transcription, and replication independent of the nucleus. Soon after, the discoveries of uniparental and doubly uniparental inheritance came.

=== Poky mutants of Neurospora ===
A well studied example of uniparental inheritance involves the poky mutants of Neurospora crassa. The original poky mutant was isolated by Mitchell and Mitchell in 1952 as a spontaneously occurring slow growing variant. In genetic crosses, the poky phenotype was found to be maternally inherited. The protoperithecial parent is regarded as the female (maternal) parent in Neurospora. When poky females were crossed to wild-type males, all progeny had the poky phenotype. When wild-type females were crossed to poky males, all progeny had the wild-type phenotype. That the poky determinant is only passed through the female line suggested that the determinant resides in the maternal cytoplasm. It was eventually shown that the primary defect in the poky mutants is a deletion in the mitochondrial DNA sequence encoding the small ribosomal RNA subunit.

== See also ==
- Epigenetic inheritance
- Extranuclear inheritance
- Gregor Johann Mendel
- Mendelian inheritance
- Non-Mendelian inheritance
- Organelles
