= Rollins A. Emerson =

American geneticist (1873–1947)

Rollins Adams Emerson
- Born: May 5, 1873; Pillar Point, New York, United States
- Died: December 8, 1947 (aged 74)
- Education: University of Nebraska, Harvard
- Spouse: Harriet Hardin
- Scientific career
- Fields: Genetics, Plant Biology
- Workplaces: University of Nebraska, Cornell University
- Thesis: The inheritance of a recurring somatic variation in variegated ears of maize (1914)
- Doctoral advisor: Edward Murray East
- Doctoral students: George F. Sprague, George Wells Beadle, Milislav Demerec, Marcus Morton Rhoades, Lewis Stadler
- Other notable students: Barbara McClintock

Rollins Adams Emerson (May 5, 1873 – December 8, 1947) was an American geneticist who rediscovered the laws of inheritance established by Gregor Mendel.

== Early life ==
Emerson was born on May 5, 1873, in tiny Pillar Point, New York, but when he was seven his family moved to Kearney County, Nebraska, where he attended public school and the University of Nebraska. He enrolled in the College of Agriculture there, having developed an interest in the local flora and landscaping while quite young.

== Education and career ==
Emerson graduated in 1897 and began working for the Department of Agriculture as an editor. Soon afterwards he married Harriet Hardin, with whom he had four children. In 1899 he accepted a position at the University of Nebraska, as an assistant professor of horticulture. In 1910–1911 Emerson took a year's leave of absence to pursue graduate work at Harvard University, which awarded him a doctorate in 1913 with Edward M. East as his supervisor, although Emerson spent only one year at Harvard. Emerson continued his work at the University of Nebraska until 1914 when he moved to Cornell University in 1914 as professor of plant breeding and head of the department of plant breeding, a position he held until his retirement in 1942. In 1947 he fell ill, and died on December 8, 1947, aged 74.

== Research ==
Emerson's interests while he was at Nebraska included a wide range of projects including culture methods for different fruit and vegetables and the possibility of domesticating wild plants. Using bean breeding techniques he set up an experiment to establish the same results as Mendel, of whom he had not heard at the time.

While at Nebraska he also became interested in using maize for his research, studying the heritability of pericarp variegation in calico maize. Ears on plants grown from variegated kernels show one pattern of striping, but the pigmentation of the kernel varies, as does the red area. Emerson discovered that the more red there was in the kernels planted, the larger the amount of red ears in the progeny. Emerson became one of the first people to suggest that mutations could cause variations in organisms. Cornell University, through Emerson's efforts, became a centre for maize genetics research. His doctoral students include George Wells Beadle, Milislav Demerec, Marcus Morton Rhoades, George F. Sprague, and Lewis Stadler.

Emerson was an elected member of the American Academy of Arts and Sciences, the American Philosophical Society, and the United States National Academy of Sciences. Emerson was responsible for setting up The Maize Newsletter (http://www.maizegdb.org/mnl.php) in 1932. In 2018, the R. Emerson lifetime achievement award was named in his honor, and has since been awarded annually by the Maize Genetics Cooperation, an outgrowth of the community established by the maize news letter.
