= Detasseling =

Removing male flowers from corn plants

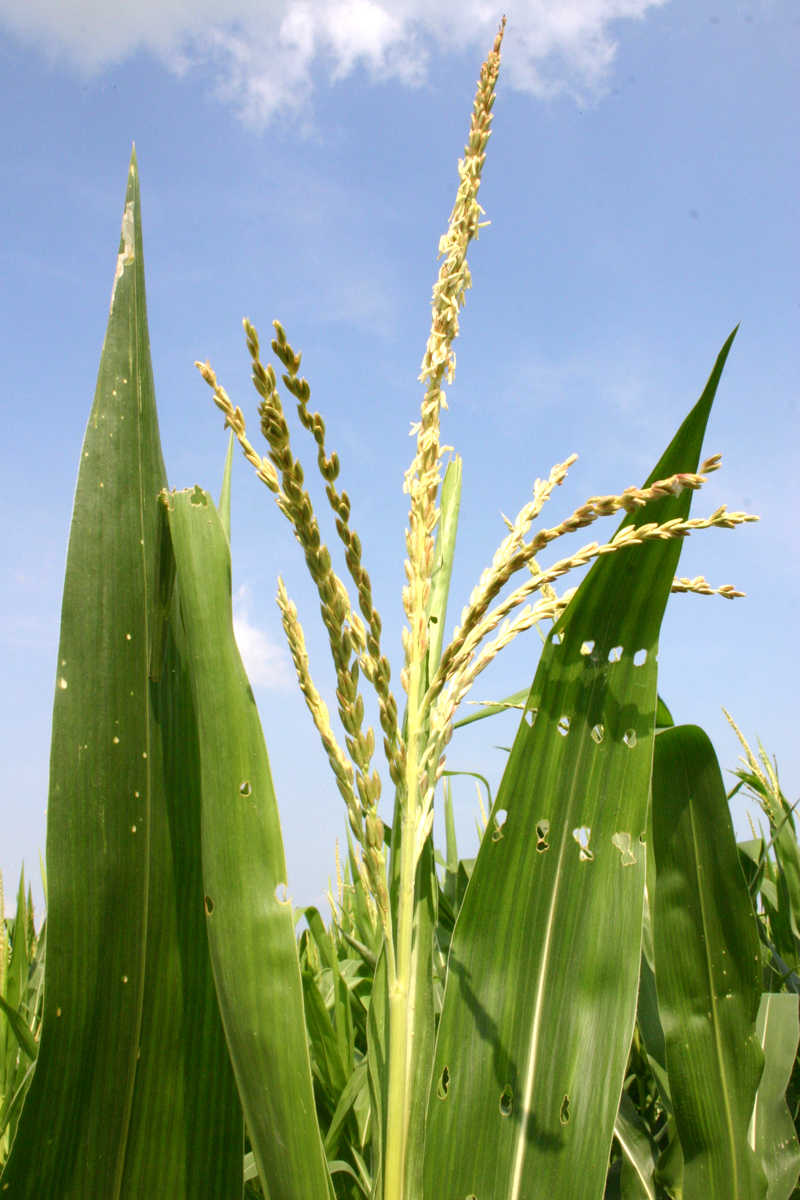
The tassel of a corn plant

Detasseling corn is removing the pollen-producing flowers, the tassel, from the tops of corn (maize) plants and placing them on the ground. It is a form of pollination control, employed to cross-breed, or hybridize, two varieties of corn.

Fields of corn that will be detasseled are planted with two varieties of corn. Removing the tassels from all the plants of one variety leaves the grain that is growing on those plants to be fertilized by the tassels of the other, resulting in a hybrid. In addition to being more physically uniform, hybrid corn produces dramatically higher yields than corn produced by open pollination. With modern seed corn, the varieties to hybridize are carefully selected so that the new variety will exhibit specific traits found in the parent plants. The detasseling process usually involves the use of both specialized machines and human labor.

== Machine detasseling ==
Nearly all detasseling is done in two steps; the field is first detasseled by machine and then detasseled manually. Machine detasseling itself is typically a two step process. Initially a detasseling machine called a "cutter" goes through the rows of corn to be detasseled and cuts off the top portion of the plant. This is done to make the field more uniform so that a "puller" machine can come through the corn field a few days later and pull the tassel out of the plant by catching it between two rollers moving at a high speed. This removes the majority of the tassels.

Detasseling machines typically remove 60 to 90 percent of the tassels in a seed corn field. This is far less than the 99.5 percent that need to be removed to produce the uniformity of seed desired by farmers. The main problems for the machines are that they are unable to adapt quickly to height differences in plants and they throw tassels into the air where they can become lodged in other corn plants and inadvertently allow pollination. It is desirable that the pulled tassel ends up on the ground to prevent this problem.

== Manual detasseling ==
Whether or not a field of seed corn is initially detasseled by machines, eventually people are employed to detassel the plants that the machines missed and to remove any tassels that the machines left in the leaves of other corn plants. This is done either by having "detasselers" walk through the corn field removing the tassels or by having detasselers ride through the corn field on a detasseler carrier. Detasseler carriers are typically employed when the corn is too tall to be detasseled from ground level. Each carrier can hold from eight to twelve detasselers.

Detasseling work is usually performed by teens; as such, it serves as a typical rite of passage in rural areas of the Corn Belt of the Midwestern United States. For many teens in these areas, it is their first job. Exact starting dates depend on the specific area of the country and the growing conditions of any given year. The detasseling "season" typically lasts from two to four weeks, with work days varying from just a few hours to over 10 hours, depending on the growing season. Wages for detasselers vary greatly; some detasselers earn minimum wage, while others earn over $12.00 per hour. Individual wages depend on the seed corn company, the detasseling contractor, the experience of the detasseler and even the individual field conditions, such as the number of plants per acre, percentage of the tassels pulled by a detasseling machine or the height of the corn.

The manner by which wages are determined can also vary greatly between detasseling contractors. Some pay a straight hourly wage; others pay on a piece rates basis, where detasselers are paid an amount for every row, panel or acre detasseled. Other contractors use a rating system to determine detasseler wages for a given day.

In addition to employing a large teenage workforce, some areas of the country employ migrant workers as detasselers. Migrant workers wages are usually paid on a piece rates basis.

== History ==
=== Early 20th century ===
Detasseling was used in the late 19th and early 20th centuries in the "ear-row" method of corn breeding. In this method, alternating rows of corn are detasseled and the seed from the detasseled rows is saved for planting the following season. However, ear-row breeding did not result in large yield increases and was largely abandoned after a few years.

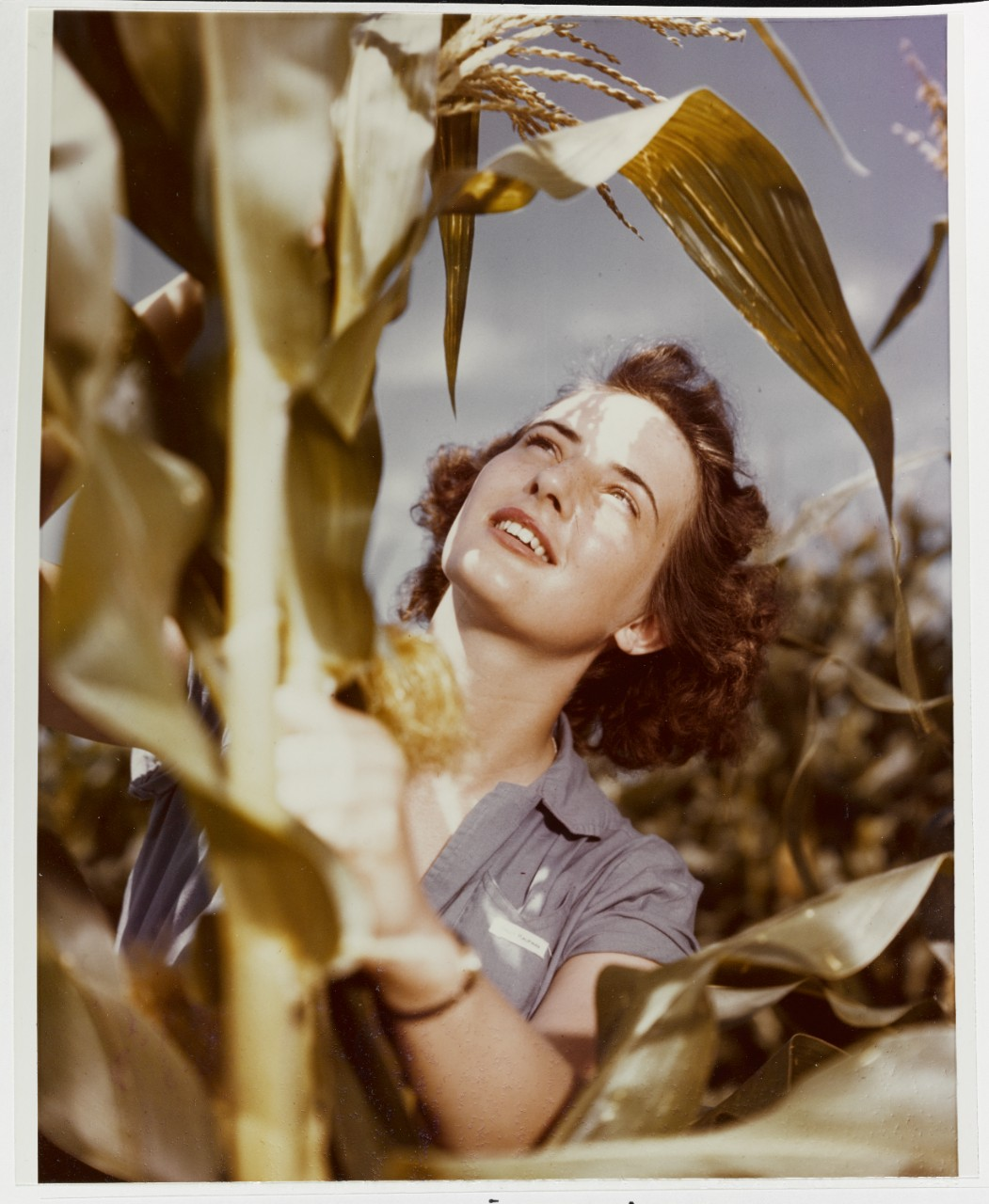
A WAVE trainee detasseling corn in Iowa circa 1944

Around 1910, experimental corn breeders became excited by the possibility of improving corn yields by crossing two high yielding varieties. Again, this was accomplished by planting the varieties in alternating rows and detasseling one of the varieties. This method of seed production also proved disappointing and was also abandoned.

However, the modern hybridization process, where one inbred line of corn is crossed with another, developed from this early work in cross breeding. In 1908, George Harrison Shull described heterosis, also known as hybrid vigor. Heterosis describes the tendency of the progeny of a specific cross to outperform both parents. In 1917, a process was developed that would make this hybridization commercially viable. In 1933, less than 1% of the corn produced in the United States was produced from hybrid seed; by 1944, over 83% was. This hybrid seed is produced by crossing two inbred lines by planting a row of one inbred variety followed by several rows of a second variety. The tassels of the second variety were removed by hand so that the second variety could be pollinated by the first.

=== Late 20th century ===
Hybrid corn was detasseled manually until the mid-1950s, when a cytoplasm was discovered that would cause one of the inbred lines to be male sterile while the hybridized seed corn it produced would regain male fertility. This gene allowed seed corn companies to greatly reduce their labor costs by producing seed corn without the need for manual detasseling. By the mid-1960s, nearly all seed corn was produced with this gene.

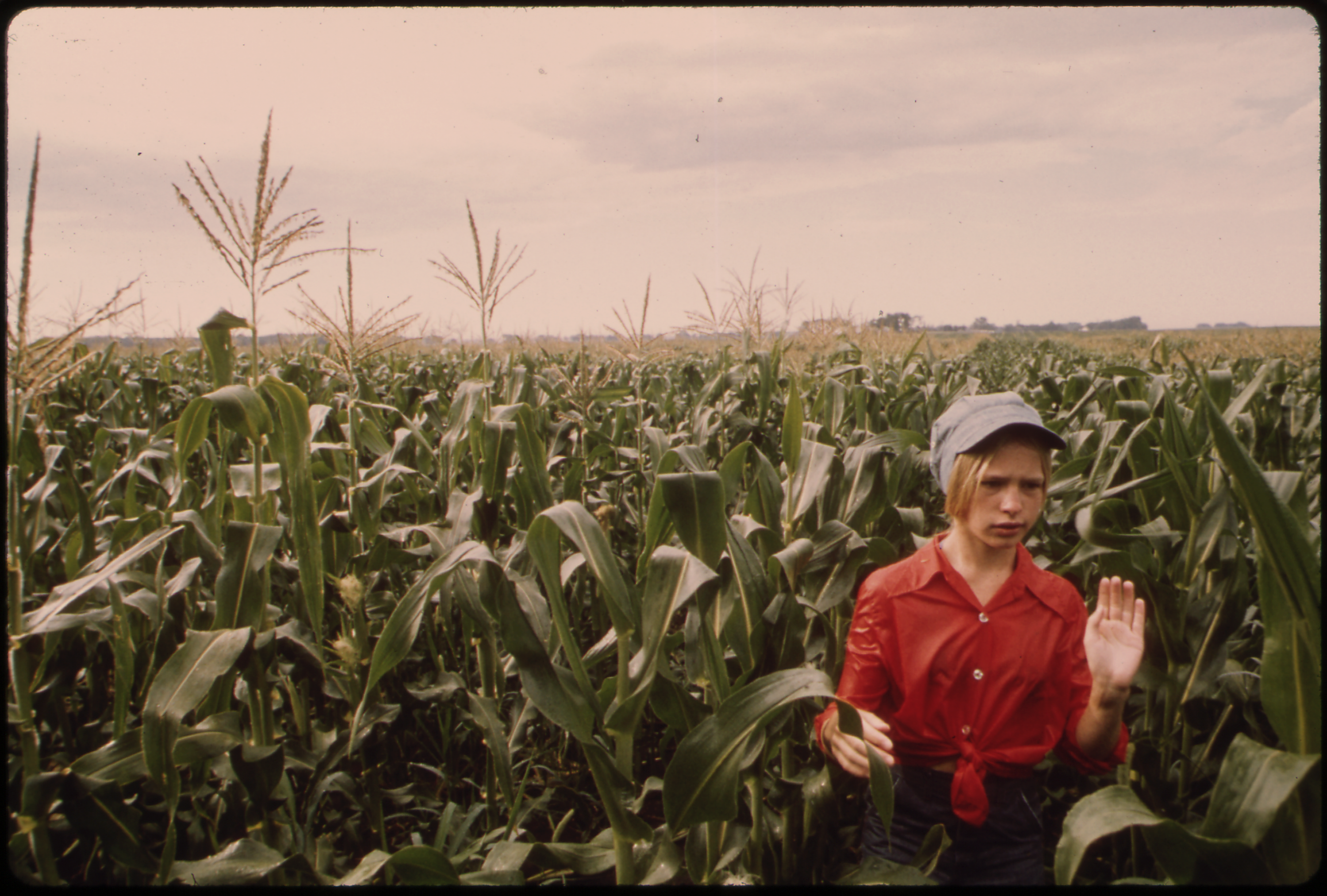
Teenager manually detasseling corn in Minnesota. July, 1974

This situation changed in 1971 with an outbreak of the fungus southern corn leaf blight. The cytoplasm used to produce male sterility was highly susceptible to this fungus. At the time, approximately 90% of hybrid corn used in the United States contained this gene. About 15% of the corn crop was lost to infection, and for the next few years, male sterility was abandoned and nearly all seed corn was again detasseled manually.

In the mid-1970s, machines were developed to help reduce the large labor costs associated with manual detasseling and as a response to a shrinking rural teen labor force. In the 1980s, male sterile varieties that were not susceptible to southern corn leaf blight were reintroduced; however, the reliance on a single sterile variety seen in the 1960s has not been repeated.

Today, corn hybridization is accomplished by a combination of machine and manual detasseling as well as male-sterile genes.

== Seed corn fields ==
Seed corn fields are planted in a repetitive pattern known as a "panel", "block" or "set", depending on the area of the country. There are two main planting patterns for these panels. A panel may be planted in a 6:2 pattern, where six "female" rows, the rows to be detasseled, are followed by two "male" or "bull" rows, the rows that will be used to pollinate the detasseled rows. Panels are also commonly planted in a 4:1 ratio, with four female rows followed by a single male row. Other, less common, patterns are also used, including 4:2 and 4:1:6:1. In all cases, the pattern is continued throughout the corn field.

All or portions of seed corn fields may be surrounded by extra rows of male plants if it is likely that wind may carry foreign pollen into the seed corn field. These extra rows are called "buffer" or "isolation" rows, depending on the area of the country. Another important aspect to keeping undesirable pollen out of seed corn fields is a process known as roguing, a process that removes plants that differ from the variety intentionally planted.
