= Cytoplasmic male sterility =

Type of male sterility in hermaphrodite organisms

Cytoplasmic male sterility is total or partial male sterility in hermaphrodite organisms, as the result of specific nuclear and mitochondrial interactions. Male sterility is the failure to produce functional anthers, pollen, or male gametes. Such male sterility in hermaphrodite populations leads to gynodioecious populations (populations with coexisting fully functioning hermaphrodites and male-sterile hermaphrodites).

Cytoplasmic male sterility, as the name indicates, is under extranuclear genetic control (under control of the mitochondrial or plastid genomes). It shows non-Mendelian inheritance, with male sterility inherited maternally. In general, there are two types of cytoplasm: N (normal) and aberrant S (sterile) cytoplasms. These types exhibit reciprocal differences.

== History ==
Joseph Gottlieb Kölreuter was the first to document male sterility in plants. In the 18th century, he reported on anther abortion within species and specific hybrids.

Cytoplasmic male sterility (CMS) is mostly found in angiosperms and has been identified in more than 140 angiosperm species.

CMS has also been identified in one animal species so far, Physa acuta, a fresh water snail.

There is strong evidence for gynodioecy and CMS to be a transitionary step between hermaphrodites and separated sexes.

Male sterility is more prevalent than female sterility. This could be because the male sporophyte and gametophyte are less protected from the environment than the ovule and embryo sac. Male-sterile plants can set seed and propagate. Female-sterile plants cannot develop seeds and will not propagate.

Manifestation of male sterility in CMS may be controlled either entirely by cytoplasmic factors or by interactions between cytoplasmic factors and nuclear factors. Male sterility can arise spontaneously via mutations in nuclear genes and/or cytoplasmic or cytoplasmic–genetic. In this case, the trigger for CMS is in the extranuclear genome – (mitochondria or chloroplast). The extranuclear genome is only maternally inherited. Natural selection on cytoplasmic genes could also lead to low pollen production or male sterility.

Male sterility is easy to detect because a large number of pollen grains are produced in male fertile plants. Pollen grains can be assayed through staining techniques (carmine, lactophenol or iodine).

== Resource relocation ==
CMS is one case of male-sterility, but this condition can also originate from nuclear genes. In the case of nuclear male sterility (when male sterility is caused by a nuclear mutation), the transmission of the male sterility allele is cut in half, since the entire male reproductive pathway is canceled.

CMS differs from the latter case (nuclear male sterility) because most cytoplasmic genetic elements are only transmitted maternally. This entails that for a cytoplasmic genetic element, causing male sterility doesn't affect its transmission rate since it is not transmitted via the male reproductive pathway.

Inactivation of the male reproductive pathway (sperm production, production of male reproductive organs, etc) can lead to resource relocation to the female reproductive pathway, increasing the female reproductive capabilities (female fitness), this phenomenon is referred to as Female Advantage (FA). The female advantage of many gynodioecious species has been quantified (as the ratio between male-sterile's female fitness and hermaphrodites' female fitness) and is mostly comprised between 1 and 2.

In the case of nuclear male-sterility, a female advantage of at least 2 is required to make it evolutionary neutral (FA=2) or advantageous (FA > 2) since half of the transmission is cut because of the male-sterility allele.

Cytoplasmic male-sterility requires no female advantage to be evolutionary neutral (FA=1), or a small female advantage to be evolutionary advantageous (FA > 1).

As far as we know, CMS is much more common than nuclear male-sterility with results from a study of 49 gynodioecious plants found 17 species (35%) exhibiting CMS and only 7 (14%) exhibiting nuclear male-sterility (all remaining species have unknown determinism of male-sterility).

== Genetic sterility ==
While CMS is controlled by an extranuclear genome, nuclear genes may have the capability to restore fertility. When nuclear restoration of fertility genes is available for a CMS system in any crop, it is cytoplasmic–genetic male sterility; the sterility is manifested by the influence of both nuclear (with Mendelian inheritance) and cytoplasmic (maternally inherited) genes. There are also restorers of fertility (Rf) genes that are distinct from genetic male sterility genes. The Rf genes have no expression of their own unless the sterile cytoplasm is present. Rf genes are required to restore fertility in S cytoplasm that causes sterility. Thus plants with N cytoplasm are fertile and S cytoplasm with genotype Rf- leads to fertiles while S cytoplasm with rfrf produces only male steriles. Another feature of these systems is that Rf mutations (i.e., mutations to rf or no fertility restoration) are frequent, so that N cytoplasm with Rfrf is best for stable fertility.

Cytoplasmic–genetic male sterility systems are widely exploited in crop plants for hybrid breeding, and for maintaining hybrid lines, due to the convenience of controlling sterility expression by manipulating the gene–cytoplasm combinations in any selected genotype. Incorporation of these systems for male sterility evades the need for emasculation in cross-pollinated species, thus encouraging cross breeding producing only hybrid seeds under natural conditions.

Examples of such (patented) systems, which require genetic manipulation, are: a Barnase gene construct, Pioneer's Seed Production Technology (SPT), Monsanto's Roundup Hybridization System (RHS) I and II. The GMO insertion may or may not be inherited by the filial production line.

== In hybrid breeding ==
Hybrid production requires a plant from which no viable male gametes are introduced. This selective exclusion of viable male gametes can be accomplished via different paths. One path, emasculation is done to prevent a plant from producing pollen so that it can serve only as a female parent. Another simple way to establish a female line for hybrid seed production is to identify or create a line that is unable to produce viable pollen. Since a male-sterile line cannot self-pollinate, seed formation is dependent upon pollen from another male line. Cytoplasmic male sterility is also used in hybrid seed production. In this case, male sterility is maternally transmitted and all progeny will be male sterile. These CMS lines must be maintained by repeated crossing to a sister line (known as the maintainer line) that is genetically identical except that it possesses normal cytoplasm and is therefore male-fertile. In cytoplasmic–genetic male sterility restoration of fertility is done using restorer lines carrying nuclear genes. The male-sterile line is maintained by crossing with a maintainer line carrying the same nuclear genome but with normal fertile cytoplasm.

For crops such as onions or carrots where the commodity harvested from the F1 generation is vegetative growth, male sterility is not a problem.

=== Maize breeding ===
Cytoplasmic male sterility is an important part of hybrid maize production. The first commercial cytoplasmic male sterile, discovered in Texas, is known as CMS-T. The use of CMS-T, starting in the 1950s, eliminated the need for detasseling. In the early 1970s, plants containing CMS-T genetics were susceptible to southern corn leaf blight and suffered from widespread loss of yield. Since then, CMS types C and S were used instead. Unfortunately, these lines are prone to environmentally induced fertility restoration and must be carefully monitored in the field. Environmentally induced, in contrast to genetic, restoration occurs when certain environmental stimuli signal the plant to bypass sterility restrictions and produce pollen anyway.

Genome sequencing of mitochondrial genomes of crop plants has facilitated the identification of promising candidates for CMS-related mitochondrial rearrangements. The systematic sequencing of new plant species in recent years has also uncovered the existence of several novel nuclear restoration of fertility (RF) genes and their encoded proteins. A unified nomenclature for the RF defines protein families across all plant species and facilitates comparative functional genomics. This nomenclature accommodates functional RF genes and pseudogenes, and offers the flexibility needed to incorporate additional RFs as they become available in future.
