= Chemical Institute of Canada Medal =

The Chemical Institute of Canada Medal or CIC Medal is the highest award that the Chemical Institute of Canada confers. Awarded annually since 1951, it is given to "a person who has made an outstanding contribution to the science of chemistry or chemical engineering in Canada".

The medal is presented at the annual Canadian Chemistry Conference and Exhibition or Canadian Chemical Engineering Conference, at which the recipient gives a plenary lecture.

The award commemorates the isolation of nickel by Frederik Cronstedt in 1751. The medals were originally sponsored by the International Nickel Company and consisted of 8 ounces (227g) of pure palladium. The sponsorship ended in 2006, since when the medals have been made of silver plated nickel.

== Winners ==
Source (recent winners): CIC

Date	Award Winner	Award Lecture
2024	Warren Piers	
2023	Janusz Pawliszyn, University of Waterloo	
2022	Chao-Jun Li, McGill University	
2021	Molly Shoichet, University of Waterloo	
2020	Jonathan Abbatt, University of Toronto	
2019	Linda Nazar, University of Waterloo	
2018	André Charette	A Journey Into Organic Synthesis: Evolution of Methods and Techniques to Tackle 21st Century Problems
2017	Eugenia Kumacheva	Nanoparticle Self-assembly Bridging the Gap between Molecules and Nanoparticles
2016	Stephen G. Withers	Design and Discovery of Enzyme Inhibitors Towards Therapies for Diabetes and Influenza
2015	Axel D. Becke	Full Circle, A Career in Density-Functional Theory
2014	Douglas Stephan	From Frustrated Lewis Pairs to Electrophlic Phosphorium Cations: Metal-free Approaches to Hydrogenation Catalysis
2013	Mark Lautens	Multicomponent-Multicatalytic Reactions (MC)2R
2012	Raymond Andersen	Sponging Off Nature for New Drug Leads
2011	Adi Eisenberg	Block Copolymer Vesicles Following Nature's Trail with Bigger Molecules
2010	Tom Ziegler	Approaching Chemistry from First Principle with Density Functional Theory
2009	R. J. Dwayne Miller	Making the Molecular Movie: Quest for the Structure-Function Correlation of Biology
2008	John Vederas	The Chemistry and Biology of Getting Drugs from Bugs
2007	Diethard Böhme	Gas-Phase Ions and Chemical Mass Spectrometry
2006	Ronald Kluger	Molecular Keystones: Lessons from Bioorganic Reaction Mechanisms
2005	Peter J. Guthrie	Computational Chemistry as a Tool for Mechanistic Investigations: Predicting Rate and Equilibrium Constants
2004	Mitchell A. Winnik	Nanowires and Nanotubes through Block-Copolymer Self-Assembly
2003	Raymond E. Kapral	
2002	Chris E. Brion	Experimental Observation of Orbital-Like Behaviour of Valence Electrons: Which Orbital Models are Appropriate For Describing Electron Transfer?
2001	Geoffrey Ozin	Race for the Photonic Chip
2000	Brian R. James	
1999	Juan Cesar Scaiano	Laser Applications in the Study of Organic Reaction Mechanisms
1998	Richard J. Puddephatt	Bond Activation by Organoplatinum Compounds
1997	Howard Alper	Catalysis Today: New Opportunities for Tomorrow
1996	G. Michael Bancroft	Synchrotron Radiation: the Light Source of the Future
1995	J. Bryan Jones	Studies on Enzymes. A Personal Perspective
1994	William A. G. Graham	The Rich Potential of Trispyraxolylborate Ligands
1993	Paul Brumer	Control of Chemical Reactions Using Lasers
1992	Donald Allan Ramsay	The Spectra of Free Radicals
1991	Keith C. Yates	The Nature of Photohydration Reactivity
1990	Ashok Vijh	Excursions in Electrochemical Physics
1989	John L. Holmes	Novel Ions, Molecules and Radicals; Mass Spectrometry's Gifts to Chemistry
1988	Stephen Hanessian	Man, Machine and Heuristics in Synthesis Planning
1987	John C. D. Brand	Multiphoton Spectroscopy
1986	Paul Kebarle	Energy Changes of Ionic Reactions in the Gas Phase and Solution - Bridging of the Two Fields
1985	Adrian G. Brook	One Thing Leads to Another - From Silylcarbinols to Silaethylenes
1984	Peter Yates	Aspects of the Photochemistry of Cyclic Ketones
1983	Camille Sandorfy	Chemical Spectroscopy in the Far Ultraviolet
1982	P. de Mayo	Superficial Photochemistry
1981	Keith U. Ingold	Oxidation and Its. Prevention in Petrochemicals, Food and Living Systems
1980	W. Howard Rapson	Chemistry and Human Welfare
1979	Bernard Belleau	The Curse of Opium: Requital through Medicinal Organic Chemistry
1978	R. J. Cvetanović	Some Current Trends in Chemical Kinetics
1977	Ronald J. Gillespie	Structural Chemistry of the Main Group Elements
1976	John C. Polanyi	Molecular Motions in Chemical Reactions
1975	Brian E. Conway	Electrochemical Studies in Surface Science
1974	Harold J. Bernstein	Resonance Raman Spectroscopy
1973	Stanley Mason	The Micro-Rheology of Disperse Systems
1972	Gerhard Herzberg	Spectra of Simple Free Radicals
1971	Keith J. Laidler	Adventures in Chemical Kinetics
1970	Donald J. Le Roy	The Kinetics of the Simplest Chemical Reactions
1969	Charles A. McDowell	Photoelectron Spectroscopy
1968	James A. Morrison	The Unexpected Behavior of Solid Methane at Very Low Temperatures
1967	Harold E. Gunning	Sulphur Atom Chemistry
1966	William-Henry Gauvin	High Temperature Research
1965	Paul-Antoine Giguère	Thirty Years of Peroxide Chemistry
1964	Raymond U. Lemieux	The Chemical Synthesis of Glycosides
1963	Karel Wiesner	Ten Years of Studies on Basic Terpenes at the University of New Brunswick
1962	Erich Baer	Natural Phospholipids - Synthesis and Structure
1961	William G. Schneider	Problem Electrons
1960	C. B. Purves	Locating Substituents in Cellulose - A Review
1959	Richard H. F. Manske	Fifty Years with Alkaloids
1958	Carl A. Winkler	Active Nitrogen
1957	Henry G. Thode	The Geochemistry of the Sulphur Isotopes
1956	Leo Marion	The Biogenesis of Alkaloids
1955	Alvin R. Gordon	Current Problems in the Field of the Electrolytes
1954	R. K. Stratford	Thirty Years in Petroleum Research
1953	E. W. R. Steacie	Present Status of Radical Mechanisms for Organic Decompositions
1952	Otto Maass	Some Underlying Factors Involving the Process of Wood Pulp Production
1951	T. Thorvaldson	The Training of Chemists for Industry

== See also ==
- List of chemistry awards
