= Murder of Lakhvinder Cheema =

2009 murder case in the United Kingdom

Lakhvir Singh
- Known for: Murder of ex-lover through poisoning
- Criminal charges: Murder and Grievous bodily harm
- Criminal penalty: Life imprisonment (minimum of 23 years)
- Criminal status: In prison
- Spouse: Aunkar Singh
- Children: 3

Lakhvinder Cheema was murdered on 27 January 2009 in Southall, West London, by his former lover, Lakhvir Kaur Singh through the use of poison derived from the Aconitum ferox plant, which contains the highly toxic alkaloid pseudaconitine. Singh became known as "The Curry Killer" due to the food to which the poison was added. The case is of note due to the cruel method of killing and the degree of premeditation, with Singh travelling to India to procure bikh poison, prepared from Aconitum ferox. Singh received a life sentence with a 23-year minimum term.

== Background ==
Singh had engaged in a 16-year affair with Lakhvinder Cheema after his first marriage had failed. She had three children and her husband Aunkar was being treated for cancer.

The main event leading up to the murder of Cheema was his breaking off the affair to enter in an engagement with a younger woman in November 2008. Prior to this Singh had threatened that she would burn down his house if she found him in bed with the woman.

== Murder ==
After the break-up, Cheema was hospitalized for a week in December 2008 with suspected poisoning after consuming a meal prepared by Singh. A month later, Singh returned from a trip to India with the aconite that would later be used in the murder. On 27 January 2009 Singh went to the victim's home and laced a leftover curry in his refrigerator with the poison, knowing that he and his fiancée, Gurjeet Choongh, were planning to eat the dish that evening.

Cheema had second helpings of the curry. After the dinner he began to vomit, his face became numb; he soon lost vision and the use of his limbs. Though his sister was able to get the couple to a hospital, Cheema died within an hour of arrival. Choongh suffered the same symptoms, but was placed into a medically induced coma and made a full recovery.

During a 999 call, Cheema stated he had been poisoned by his ex-girlfriend.

== Trial ==
The case gained attention due to the particularly cruel nature of Cheema's killing. Victims of aconitine poisoning suffer severe vomiting, and often become paralysed. Their organs stop working and they die from asphyxiation, yet they remain conscious throughout. The case was also unusual, as the last prosecution for murder using aconitine was that of George Henry Lamson in 1882.

The trial took place at the Old Bailey in February 2010. Singh attempted to blame her brother-in-law Varinda for the crime but a lodger had witnessed her taking the curry out of the fridge on the day of the murder. It was also revealed that a plastic bag containing brown powder was found in Singh's coat. She had claimed this was medication for a rash on her neck, whereas it was in fact Indian aconite, matching the poison found in the curry.

== Sentence ==
Singh was convicted on 10 February 2010 of the murder of Lakhvinder Cheema and grievous bodily harm against his new fiancée who survived the attack (Singh was acquitted of attempted murder). Singh was also acquitted of administering poison to her ex-lover's food on a previous occasion.

The Crown had sought life imprisonment for Singh with a minimum term of 30 years, due to the gravity of the case and the level of premeditation involved in addition to the fact there had been two victims. Singh received a life sentence with a 23-year minimum term.

== See also ==
- Dena Thompson, British woman who murdered her second husband by poisoning his curry

== Bibliography ==
- Bonnici, Kathleen; Stanworth, Denise; Simmonds, Monique SJ; Mukherjee, Elora; Ferner, Robin E (November 2010). "Flowers of evil". The Lancet. 376 (9752): 1616. doi:10.1016/S0140-6736(10)61059-8. PMID 21056765. S2CID 1163612.
- "Lakhvir Singh". Made for Murder. Season 1. Episode 9. 12 December 2021. 60 minutes in. Pick TV.
