= Techron =

Patented fuel additive developed by the Chevron Corporation

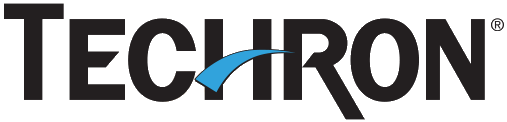
- Product type: Fuel additives
- Current owner: Chevron Corporation
- Produced by: Chevron Corporation
- Country: United States
- Introduced: 1981; 45 years ago
- Markets: Motor service
- Website: techron.com

Techron is a formerly patented fuel additive developed by Chevron Corporation and sold in its fuel operations (including Texaco and Caltex). It contains polyether amine (PEA) and polybutene amine (PBA), which are detergent additives purported to dissolve deposits in automotive engines and prevent them from building up.

Chevron released Techron as an additive in 1981, and began including it in all of their gasoline products in 1995. It is still available as a concentrate today. The Chevron Cars that debuted in 1995 were used to advertise the additive.

== Components ==
Techron consists of five components:

1. Distillates, hydrotreated light at 40-70% weight
2. Stoddard solvent at 15-40% weight
3. Solvent naphtha (petroleum), light aromatic at 5-10% weight
4. 1,2,4-trimethylbenzene at 1-5% weight
5. Polyetheramine (PEA) (detergent), polyether amines at 20-49% weight

== Predecessor ==
"Techroline" was the predecessor to Techron. The company claimed it could control combustion-chamber deposits in cars, as well as keep their fuel-intake systems clean.

== See also ==
- List of automotive fuel brands
