= Janusz Pawliszyn =

Polish chemist (born 1954)

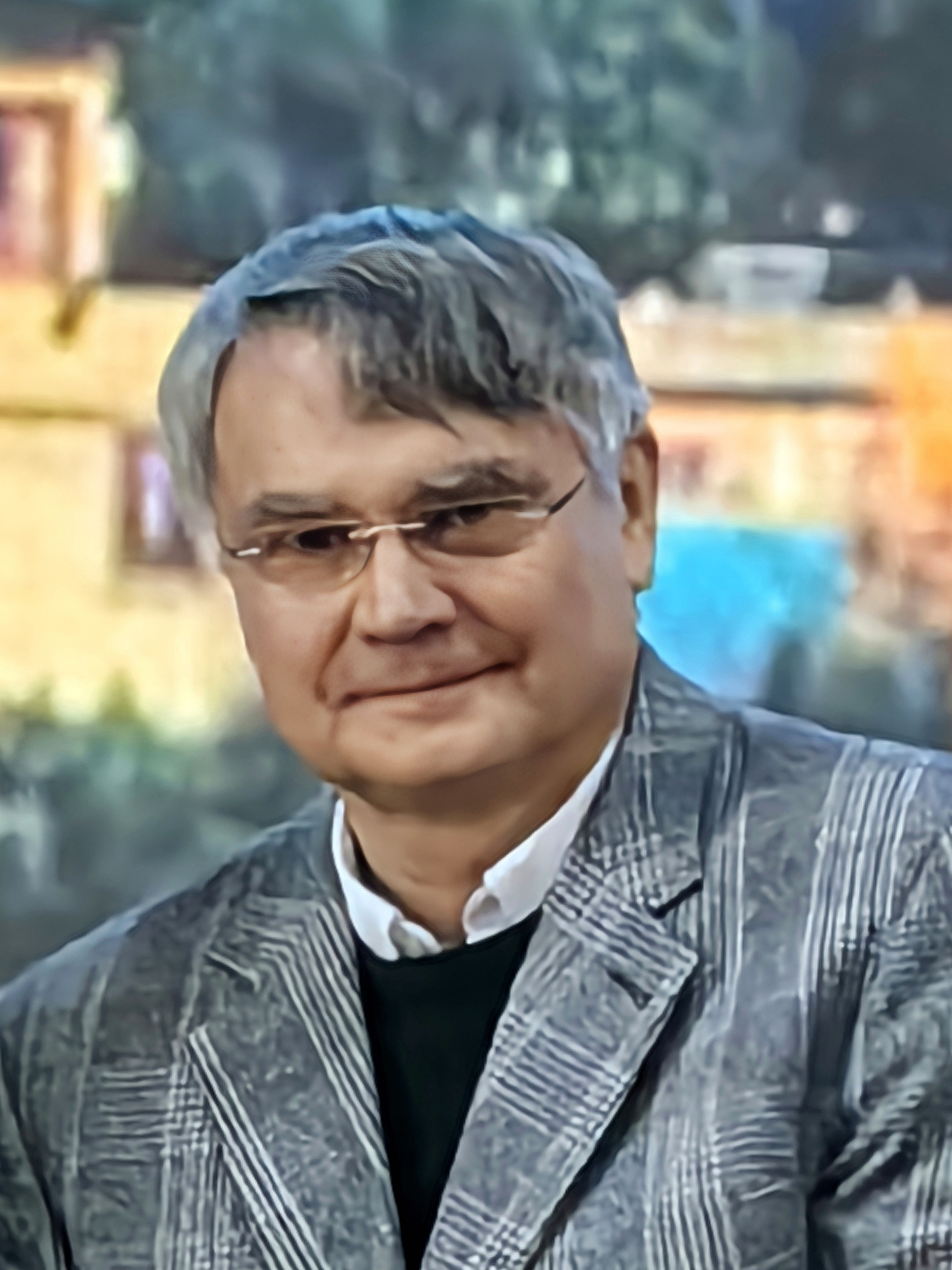
- Pawliszyn in 2024
- Born: May 16, 1954 (age 72); Gdańsk, Poland
- Occupation: Chemist
- Known for: Solid-phase microextraction
- Awards: Chemical Institute of Canada Medal (2023); Talanta Medal (2019); ACS Award in Chromatography (2018); Pittsburgh Analytical Chemistry Award (2017); Marie Curie Medal (2015); LeSueur Memorial Award (2013)

Academic background
- Education: B.Sc./Chem.Eng., 1977, engineering, M.Sc., 1978, bioorganic chemistry, Gdańsk University of Technology; PhD, analytical chemistry, 1982, Southern Illinois University

Janusz Boleslaw Pawliszyn FRSC (Polish pronunciation: [ˈjanuʂ pavˈliʂɨn]; born May 16, 1954) is a Polish chemist. He is a Canada Research Chair at the University of Waterloo and Natural Sciences and Engineering Research Council of Canada Industrial Research Chair in New Analytical Methods and Technologies.

== Early life and education ==
Pawliszyn was born on May 16, 1954, in Gdańsk, Poland. Pawliszyn began his education in Poland by attending the Gdańsk University of Technology for his Bachelor of Science degree in engineering and Master's degree in bioorganic chemistry. Following this, he moved to the United States for his PhD in analytical chemistry at Southern Illinois University.

== Career ==
Following his PhD, Pawliszyn joined the faculty at Utah State University where he attempted to get funding for research on polymer-coated optical fibers that could extract both volatile and nonvolatile analytes from complex media in the liquid or gas phase. After failing to secure funding from United States-based funding agencies, he left Utah to join the University of Waterloo with support from the Natural Sciences and Engineering Research Council. Through this support, he invented the Solid-phase microextraction (SPME) technique which "uses a solid coating on a sample probe to selectively extract chemical substances from blood, saliva, urine, and even plasma. After a simple washing step, the probe can then be placed in front of the mass spectrometer for analysis." As such, the SPME technique began to be used in a large range of chromatographic methods, including environmental, forensic, bioanalytical, as well as clinical studies. Chemist Daniel W. Armstrong later stated that SPME "revolutionized many areas of sampling and analysis."

As a result of his discovery, Pawliszyn was appointed the Natural Sciences and Engineering Research Council of Canada (NSERC) Industrial Research Chair in New Analytical Methods and Technologies. He also earned numerous honours including the 1995 McBryde Medal, the 1996 Tswett Medal, the 1996 Hyphenated Techniques in Chromatography Award, the 1996 Caledon Award, and the 1998 Jubilee Medal from the Chromatographic Society. Following the September 11 attacks, SPME was used to test for toxins in the air at Ground Zero at the World Trade Center. In 2008, Pawliszyn was honoured for his invention of SPME with the EnCana Principal Award as someone who has made a significant impact in the world outside the lab. He also earned the American Chemical Society's Separations Science and Technology Award.

In March 2010, Pawliszyn was promoted to the rank of University Professor of Chemistry at the University of Waterloo. A few months later, he was recognized for "innovation leadership" as part of the Ontario Premier's Innovation Awards for 2010. Through the same year, Pawliszyn was elected a Fellow of the Royal Society of Canada for "developing state-of-the-art, integrated and automated analytical methods and instruments for on-site analysis and monitoring of living and environmental systems." Upon becoming a fellow, Pawliszyn received the 2011 Dal Nogare award from the Chromatography Forum of Delaware Valley as a scientist who has made a significant contribution in the field of chromatography. The following year, Pawliszyn was honoured by the Canadian Society for Chemistry with the 2012 E.W.R. Steacie Award as a scientist who has made a "distinguished contribution to chemistry while working in Canada."

In 2019, Pawliszyn was ranked the 9th most influential person in analytical science across the globe by Analytical Scientist. He also received the 2019 Talanta Medal for his numerous contributions to analytical chemistry and for his pioneering work in SPME.
