= Kathryn Toghill =

British chemist and academic

Kathryn Ellen Toghill
- Education: Swansea University; University of Oxford
- Scientific career
- Workplaces: University of Waterloo; Lancaster University; École Polytechnique Fédérale de Lausanne
- Thesis: Metal modified boron doped diamond electrodes and their use in electroanalysis (2011)
- Academic advisors: Linda Nazar

Kathryn Toghill is a British chemist who is Professor of Sustainable Electrochemistry at Lancaster University. Her research considers the development of low-cost energy storage systems, with a particular focus on redox flow batteries.

== Early life and education ==
Toghill was born and raised in Caernarfon, North Wales and attended the local bilingual Welsh comprehensive school Ysgol Syr Hugh Owen. Toghill was an undergraduate student at Swansea University. She spent a year at the University of Waterloo, where she worked with Linda Nazar on new cathodes for batteries. Her undergraduate research with Nazar was published in Nature Materials. After earning her First class Masters in Chemistry, Toghill moved to the University of Oxford, where she completed a doctorate with Richard Compton on modified boron doped diamond electrodes and their applications in electroanalysis. At Oxford Toghill designed an electrochemical atomic force microscopy cell. Toghill moved to the École Polytechnique Fédérale de Lausanne, where she worked with Hubert Girault. At EPFL, she developed capabilities in hybrid energy storage, investigating batteries capable of conventional operation and hydrogen evolution.

== Research and career ==
In 2014, Toghill joined the faculty at Lancaster University. Her research considers low-cost electrochemical energy storage systems including redox flow batteries. This involves the design and synthesis of new batteries and flow cells, electrode materials, as well as the development of strategies for green hydrogen and water valorisation.

In 2022, Toghill was awarded funding from Horizon Europe to develop dual circuit flow batteries for value added chemical production. Dual circuit redox flow batteries can function both as a conventional battery and as a hydrogen fuel cell.

== Selected publications ==
- Brian Ellis; Makahnouk WR; Makimura Y; Kathryn E. Toghill; Linda F. Nazar (9 September 2007). "A multifunctional 3.5 V iron-based phosphate cathode for rechargeable batteries". Nature Materials. 6 (10): 749–753. doi:10.1038/nmat2007. ISSN 1476-1122. PMID 17828278. Wikidata Q34006738.
- Toghil, Kathryn E.; Compton, Richard G. (2010). "Electrochemical non-enzymatic glucose sensors: a perspective and an evaluation" (PDF). International Journal of Electrochemical Science. 5 (9): 1246–1301.
- Véronique Amstutz; Kathryn E. Toghill; Francis Powlesland; Heron Vrubel; Christos Comninellis; Xile Hu; Hubert H. Girault (2014). "Renewable hydrogen generation from a dual-circuit redox flow battery". Energy & Environmental Science. 7 (7): 2350–2358. doi:10.1039/c4ee00098f. ISSN 1754-5692. Wikidata Q56474984.
