= SPME =

SPME may refer to:

- Solid Phase Microextraction
- Airport code for Cap. FAP Pedro Canga Rodríguez Airport in Peru.
