= Paul-Antoine Giguère =

Canadian chemist and academic (1910–1987)

- Paul-Antoine Giguère
- Born: January 13, 1910; Quebec City, Quebec
- Died: December 25, 1987 (aged 77)
- Occupations: Chemist and academic
- Awards: Léo-Pariseau Prize (1945); Guggenheim Fellowship(1946); Chemical Institute of Canada Medal(1965); Companion of the Order of Canada (1970)

Paul-Antoine Giguère, CC (January 13, 1910 – December 25, 1987) was a Canadian academic and chemist.

Born in Quebec City, he received a Bachelor of Science degree from Université Laval in 1934, and a doctorate from McGill University in 1937 under the direction of Otto Maass. He started working in the laboratory of CIL in Beloeil, Quebec and then went to work at the California Institute of Technology with Linus Pauling.

In 1941, he returned to Quebec and became a lecturer at Université Laval. He was appointed a professor in 1947 and was head of the Department of Chemistry from 1957 to 1968.

His research was in infrared and Raman spectroscopy and the determination of molecular and crystal structure. In 1946 and 1948, he was awarded a Guggenheim Fellowship in chemistry for the investigation of the molecular structure of hydrogen peroxide by infrared spectroscopy, which showed that this molecule has a skewed or nonplanar structure. In 1956 with Michael Falk, he obtained the infrared spectrum of the hydronium ion, previously believed to be too short-lived to observe a spectrum. In 1958-1959 he investigated the anomalous thermodynamic properties of ice. In 1970-75, his group observed the first infrared and Raman vibrational spectra of hydrogen trioxide (H_{2}O_{3}) in dilute aqueous solution. In 1976 with Sylvia Turrell, he showed that the weak acidity of hydrogen fluoride is due to the formation of a tightly bound ion pair [H_{3}O^{+}·F^{−}].

In 1966 he proposed a novel three-dimensional arrangement of the periodic table.

In 1970, he was made a Companion of the Order of Canada for "his research work in physical chemistry". In 1970, he was awarded an honorary Doctor of Science degree from the Université de Sherbrooke.
