= Mannich reaction =

Reaction in organic chemistry

Named after	Carl Mannich
Reaction type	Coupling reaction

Identifiers
Organic Chemistry Portal	mannich-reaction
RSC ontology ID	RXNO:0000032

In organic chemistry, the Mannich reaction is a three-component organic reaction that involves the amino alkylation of the α-position of a ketone or aldehyde with an aldehyde and a nullary, primary, or secondary amine (−NH_{2}). The final product is a β-amino-carbonyl compound also known as a Mannich base. The reaction is named after Carl Mannich.

An acid-catalyzed three component reaction with amine, ketone or aldehyde, and an enolizable carbonyl to yield a β-amino carbonyl.

The Mannich reaction starts with the nucleophilic addition of an amine to a carbonyl group followed by dehydration to the Schiff base. The Schiff base is an electrophile which reacts in a second step in an electrophilic addition with an enol formed from a carbonyl compound containing an acidic α-proton. The Mannich reaction is a condensation reaction.

== Reaction mechanism ==
The mechanism of the Mannich reaction starts with the formation of an iminium ion from the amine and aldehyde.

Arrow pushing for the formation of an iminium ion

The compound with the carbonyl functional group (in this case a ketone) will tautomerize to the enol form, after which it attacks the iminium ion.

== Asymmetric Mannich reactions ==
If the enolizable ketone or aldehyde has a substituent at the α-position, proline and similar-amino acid organocatalysts may be used to achieve the Mannich reaction stereoselectively (in regard to the relative stereochemistry of α-substituent and the resulting amino functionality at the β-position of the product).

An (S)-proline catalyzed Mannich reaction favors the formation of the product in which the substituent and amino functionalities are syn relative to one another. A modified proline catalyst, such as a methylated pyrrolidinecarboxylic acid, can be used to favor the formation of the product with the substituents anti to one another. In both cases, the organocatalyst transforms the enolizable aldehyde or ketone to an (E)-enamine. The facial selectivity of the nucleophilic attack is dictated by the preferred conformation adopted by the enamine (e.g., s-cis vs. s-trans) and the relative orientations of the enamine and imine such that the carboxylic acid functionality can protonate the imine nitrogen.

Scheme 4. Asymmetric Mannich reactions ref. Cordova (2002) and Mitsumori (2006)

== Applications ==
The Mannich reaction is used in many areas of organic chemistry, Examples include:

- alkyl amines
- peptides, nucleotides, antibiotics, and alkaloids (e.g. tropinone)
- agrochemicals, such as plant growth regulators
- polymers
- catalysts
- Formaldehyde tissue crosslinking
- Pharmaceutical drugs (e.g. rolitetracycline (the Mannich product of tetracycline and pyrrolidine), fluoxetine (antidepressant), tramadol and tolmetin (anti-inflammatory drug).
- soap and detergents, especially with application to automotive fuel
- Polyetheramines from substituted branched chain alkyl ethers.
- α,β-unsaturated ketones by the thermal degradation of Mannich reaction products (e.g. methyl vinyl ketone from 4-(diethylamino)butan-2-one)

== See also ==
- Betti reaction
- Kabachnik–Fields reaction
- Petasis reaction
- Pictet–Spengler reaction
- Stork enamine alkylation
- Nitro-Mannich reaction
- Crabbé reaction
- Aza-Baylis-Hillman reaction – Mannich addition to an enone
