= Cross dehydrogenative coupling =

Chemical reaction

Cross dehydrogenative coupling (also known as CDC reaction), coined by Chao-Jun Li of McGill University, is a type of coupling reaction allowing the construction of a carbon–carbon bond or C-Heteroatom bond directly from C–H bonds in the presence of an oxidant, leading to the thermodynamically unfavorable formal removal of a H_{2} molecule. As such, CDC are couplings belonging to the C–H activation strategy.

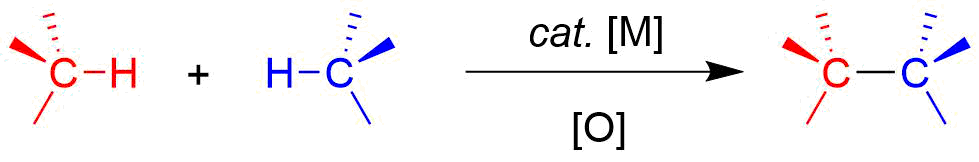
Cross-dehydrogenative-coupling between two C-H bonds.

The key to the CDC coupling is eliminating the need for substrate prefunctionalization. Therefore, the CDC reaction has the advantages of high efficiency, Atom economy and environmental friendliness. Such reactions can be achieved or activated by transition-metal catalysis or oxidation reaction (e.g. benzoquinone, peroxides, O_{2}, hypervalent iodine), or by either photocatalysis or electrocatalysis. The mechanism and reactivity of the CDC reactions varies dramatically depending on the substrate. CDC reactions have been used to construct bonds between sp^{3}-sp^{3}, sp^{3}-sp^{2}, sp^{3}-sp, sp^{2}-sp^{2}, sp^{2}-sp and sp-sp C-H bonds. The synthesis and functionalization of various nitrogen, oxygen and sulfur-containing heterocycles have also been achieved via CDC.

== See also ==
- C–H activation
- Cross-coupling
- Atom economy
- Oxidative coupling
