= Linda Nazar =

Canadian chemist

Linda Nazar FRS
- Born: Linda Faye Nazar
- Education: University of British Columbia; University of Toronto
- Awards: Chemical Institute of Canada Medal; Hughes Medal
- Scientific career
- Workplaces: University of Waterloo; Exxon Research and Engineering Company
- Doctoral advisor: Geoffrey Ozin
- Notable students: Kathryn Toghill
- Website: Nazar Group Lab

Linda Faye Nazar OC FRSC FRS is a Senior Canada Research Chair in Solid State Materials and Distinguished Research Professor of Chemistry at the University of Waterloo. She develops materials for electrochemical energy storage and conversion. Nazar demonstrated that interwoven composites could be used to improve the energy density of lithium–sulphur batteries. She was awarded the 2019 Chemical Institute of Canada Medal.

== Early life and education ==
Nazar studied chemistry at the University of British Columbia, where she earned a bachelor's degree in 1978. She was inspired to study chemistry after being inspired by her first year professor. Her father had trained as a scientist and ran his own jewellery making business. Nazar joined the University of Toronto for her graduate studies, and completed a PhD under the supervision of Geoffrey Ozin in 1984. After obtaining her degree, she worked as a postdoctoral researcher working with Allan Jacobson at Exxon Research and Engineering Company, before joining the University of Waterloo in the late 1980s, when she became interested in electrochemistry and Inorganic chemistry.

== Research and career ==
Nazar works in materials chemistry at the University of Waterloo, where she designs energy storage devices and electrochemical systems. Her research group create new materials and nanostructures for lithium–sulfur batteries, including interwoven composites. She develops structural probes to understand how the morphology of materials that are capable of charge/ ionic redox processes impact their functions. These techniques include nuclear magnetic resonance (NMR), electrochemistry, AC Impedance Spectroscopy and X-ray diffraction measurements. Nazar was a founding member of the Waterloo Institute for Nanotechnology. Nazar is recognised as being a "leading authority in advanced materials". She was awarded a Canada Research Chair in 2004, which was renewed in 2008 and 2012. In 2009 Nazar joined the California Institute of Technology as a More Distinguished Scholar. In 2013 she was awarded a $1.8 million fellowship from the National Research Council to investigate energy storage materials for automotive applications.

Nazar is particularly interested in storage materials that go beyond lithium-ion batteries, sodium-ion batteries, zinc ion batteries and magnesium-ion batteries. Lithium-ion batteries are the battery of choice in hybrid electric vehicles, but concerns have arisen about the global supply of lithium. Her early work developed porous carbon architectures as frameworks for cathodes, enhancing their conductivity and discharge capacity. She demonstrated that interwoven carbon composites could be used to improve the energy density of lithium–sulphur batteries. She showed it was possible to create mesoporous carbon frameworks that constrain the grown of sulphur nanofillers, which improved energy storage and reversibility.

Nazar calculated the low-cost lithium–sulphur batteries could take electric cars twice as far as current lithium-ion technologies. Sulphur is an abundant material that can be used to replace cobalt oxide in lithium-ion batteries. Unfortunately, sulphur can dissolve into the electrolyte solution, and be reduced by electrons to form polysulphides. They are also susceptible to high internal resistance and capacity fading on cycling. These challenges can be overcome by creating nanostructures in the electrodes. Interwoven composites can also be made from manganese dioxide, which stabilise polysuplphides in lithium–sulphur batteries. Manganese dioxide reduces sulphides via a surface-bound polythiosulphanates, and can withstand 2,000 discharge cycles without the loss of capacitance. She has also developed lithium oxygen batteries, which are lightweight with high energy density. In lithium oxygen batteries, superoxide and peroxide can act to degrade the cells; limiting their lifetime. If the electrolyte is replaced with a molten salt and the porous cathode with a bifunctional metal oxide, the peroxide does not form. Nazar has worked on supercapacitors and polyanion materials.

She was made a Professor at the University of Waterloo in 2016 and holds a Tier 1 Canada Research Chair in Solid State Energy Materials. Since 2014 Nazar has served on the board of directors of the International Meeting on Li-Batteries. She serves on the editorial boards of the journals Angewandte Chemie, Energy & Environmental Science and the Journal of Materials Chemistry A.

=== Awards and honours ===
Her awards and honours include;

- 1978 Royal Society of Chemistry Undergraduate Award
- 2010 Canadian Society for Chemistry Rio Tinto Alcan Award for Electrochemistry
- 2011 International Battery Association Award
- 2011 Royal Society of Canada Fellowship
- 2012 International Union of Pure and Applied Chemistry Distinguished Women in Chemistry
- 2013 Society of German Chemists August-Wilhelm-von-Hofmann Lectureship
- 2014 Web of Science Most Highly Cited Researchers
- 2014 Thomson Reuters World's Most Influential Scientific Minds
- 2015 Officer of the Order of Canada
- 2017 University of Waterloo Outstanding Performance Award
- 2018 Thomson Reuters Most Highly Cited Researchers
- 2019 Chemical Institute of Canada Medal
- 2020 Elected Fellow of the Royal Society
- 2022 E.W.R. Steacie Award
- 2024 The Royal Society Hughes Medal
