= Crabbé reaction =

The Crabbé reaction (or Crabbé allene synthesis, Crabbé–Ma allene synthesis) is an organic reaction that converts a terminal alkyne and aldehyde (or, sometimes, a ketone) into an allene in the presence of a soft Lewis acid catalyst (or stoichiometric promoter) and secondary amine. Given continued developments in scope and generality, it is a convenient and increasingly important method for the preparation of allenes, a class of compounds often viewed as exotic and synthetically challenging to access.

== Overview and scope ==
The transformation was discovered in 1979 by Pierre Crabbé and coworkers at the Université Scientifique et Médicale (currently merged into Université Grenoble Alpes) in Grenoble, France. As initially discovered, the reaction was a one-carbon homologation reaction (the Crabbé homologation) of a terminal alkyne into a terminal allene using formaldehyde as the carbon source, with diisopropylamine as base and copper(I) bromide as catalyst.

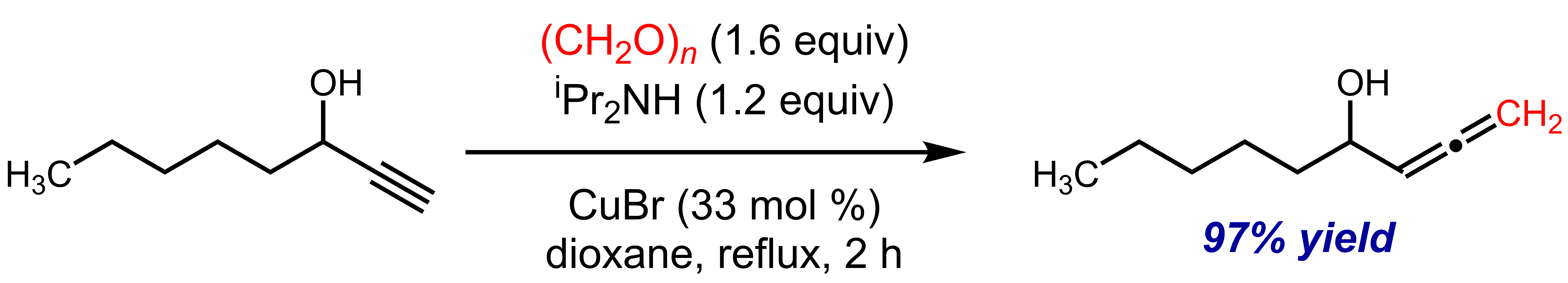

Despite the excellent result for the substrate shown, yields were highly dependent on substrate structure and the scope of the process was narrow. The author noted that iron salts were completely ineffective, while cupric and cuprous chloride and bromide, as well as silver nitrate provided the desired product, but in lower yield under the standard conditions.

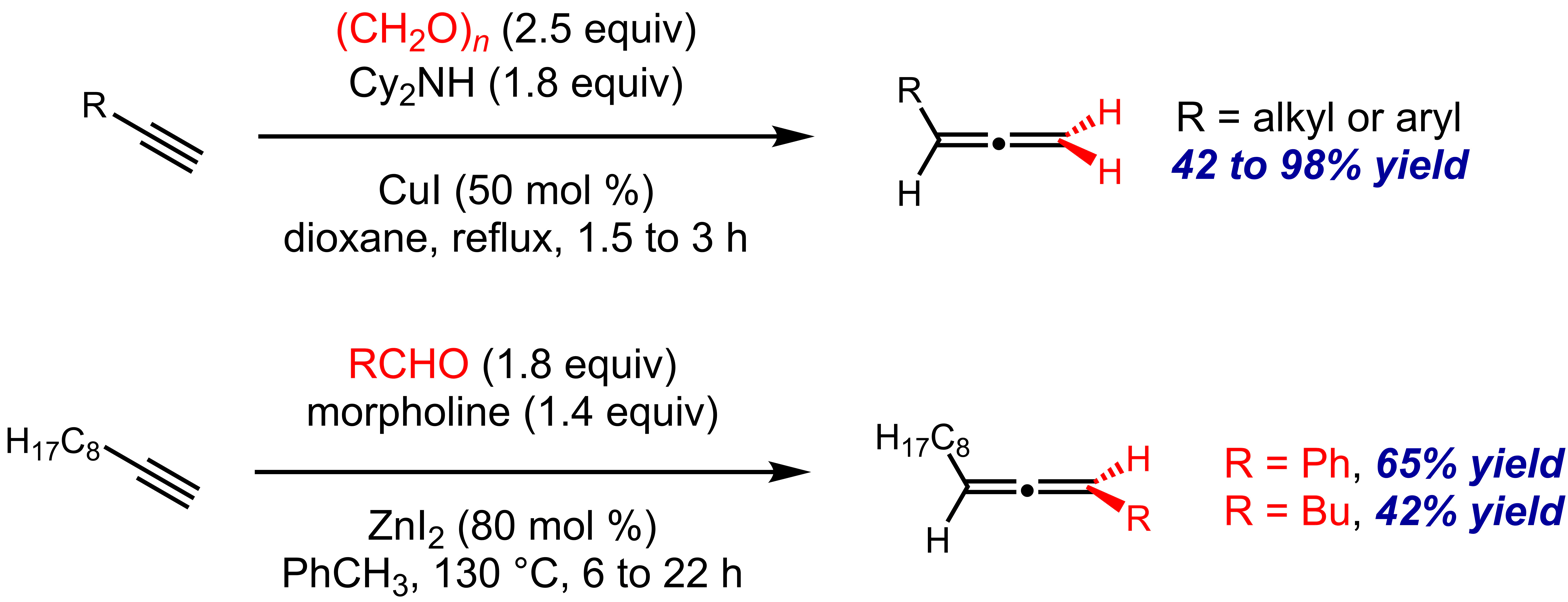

Shengming Ma (麻生明) and coworkers at the Shanghai Institute of Organic Chemistry (SIOC, Chinese Academy of Sciences) investigated the reaction in detail, including clarifying the critical role of the base, and developed conditions that exhibited superior functional-group compatibility and generally resulted in higher yields of the allene. One of the key changes was the use of dicyclohexylamine as the base. In another important advance, the Ma group found that the combination of zinc iodide and morpholine allowed aldehydes besides formaldehyde, including benzaldehyde derivatives and a more limited range of aliphatic aldehydes, to be used as coupling partners, furnishing 1,3-disubstituted allenes via an alkyne-aldehyde coupling method of substantial generality and utility. A separate protocol utilizing copper catalysis and a fine-tuned amine base was later developed to obtain better yields for aliphatic aldehydes.

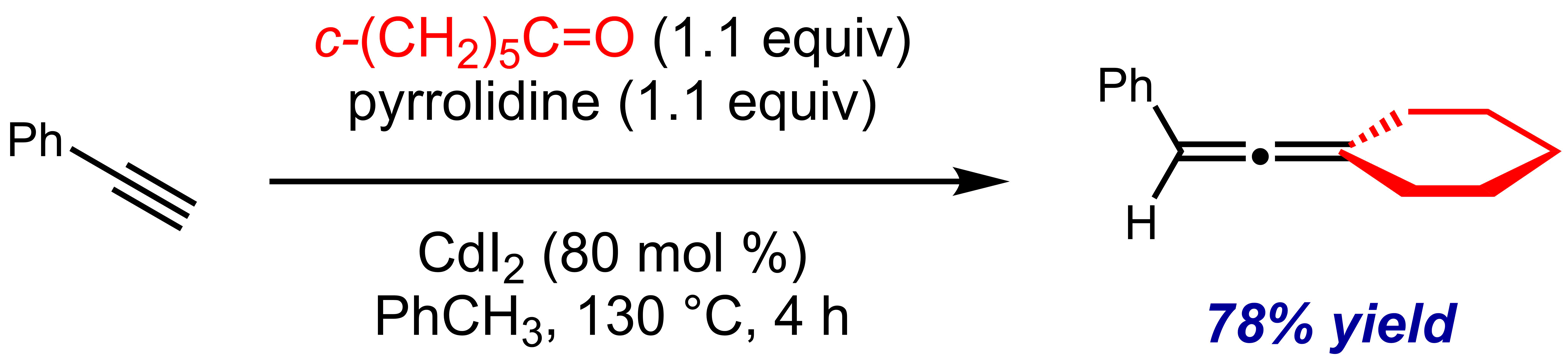

The Crabbé reaction is applicable to a limited range of ketone substrates for the synthesis of trisubstituted allenes; however, a near stoichiometric quantity (0.8 equiv) of cadmium iodide (CdI_{2}) is needed to promote the reaction. Alternatively, the use of cuprous bromide and zinc iodide sequentially as catalysts is also effective, provided the copper catalyst is filtered before zinc iodide is added.

== Prevailing mechanism ==
The reaction mechanism was first investigated by Scott Searles and coworkers at the University of Missouri. Overall, the reaction can be thought of as a reductive coupling of the carbonyl compound and the terminal alkyne. In the Crabbé reaction, the secondary amine serves as the hydride donor, which results in the formation of the corresponding imine as the byproduct. Thus, remarkably, the secondary amine serves as Brønsted base, ligand for the metal ion, iminium-forming carbonyl activator, and the aforementioned two-electron reductant in the same reaction.

In broad strokes, the mechanism of the reaction is believed to first involve a Mannich-like addition of the alkynylmetal species into the iminium ion formed by condensation of the aldehyde and the secondary amine. This first part of the process is a so-called A^{3} coupling reaction (A^{3} stands for aldehyde-alkyne-amine). In the second part, the α-amino alkyne then undergoes a formal retro-imino-ene reaction, an internal redox process, to deliver the desired allene and an imine as the oxidized byproduct of the secondary amine. These overall steps are supported by deuterium labeling and kinetic isotope effect studies. Density functional theory computations were performed to better understand the second part of the reaction. These computations indicate that the uncatalyzed process (either a concerted but highly asynchronous process or a stepwise process with a fleeting intermediate) involves a prohibitively high-energy barrier. The metal-catalyzed reaction, on the other hand, is energetically reasonable and probably occurs via a stepwise hydride transfer to the alkyne followed by C–N bond scission in a process similar to those proposed for formal [3,3]-sigmatropic rearrangements and hydride transfer reactions catalyzed by gold(I) complexes. A generic mechanism showing the main features of the reaction (under Crabbé's original conditions) is given below:

(The copper catalyst is shown simply as "CuBr" or "Cu^{+}", omitting any additional amine or halide ligands or the possibility of dinuclear interactions with other copper atoms. Condensation of formaldehyde and diisopropylamine to form the iminium ion and steps involving complexation and decomplexation of Cu^{+} are also omitted here for brevity.)

Since 2012, Ma has reported several catalytic enantioselective versions of the Crabbé reaction in which chiral PINAP (aza-BINAP) based ligands for copper are employed. The stepwise application of copper and zinc catalysis was required: the copper promotes the Mannich-type condensation, while subsequent one-step addition of zinc iodide catalyzes the imino-retro-ene reaction.

== See also ==
- Mannich reaction
- Ene reaction
- Coupling reaction
- Alkynylation
