= Chao-Jun Li =

Canadian chemist

- Education: Zhengzhou University (BSc) Chinese Academy of Sciences (MSc); McGill University (PhD) Stanford University (postdoctoral work)
- Awards: 1998 US NSF CAREER Award 2001 US Presidential Green Chemistry Challenge Award (Academic); 2007 Fellow of the Royal Society of Chemistry (UK); 2012 Fellow of the Royal Society of Canada (Academy of Sciences); 2012 Fellow of the American Association for the Advancement of Science; 2012 Fellow of the Chemical Institute of Canada; 2015 Fellow of the American Chemical Society; 2016 Fellow of The World Academy of Sciences (TWAS); 2020 Fellow of the Chinese Chemical Society; 2020 Fellow of The European Academy of Sciences; 2025 Fellow of the Canadian Academy of Engineering; 2021 Humboldt Prize; 2022 CIC Medal; 2002 Japan Society for the Promotion of Science Senior Fellow 2018 Killam Fellow of the Canadian Council of Arts
- Scientific career
- Fields: Green chemistry, organic chemistry
- Workplaces: McGill University (2003-present) Tulane University (1994–2003)
- Academic advisors: Tak-Hang Chan David Harpp Barry Trost
- Website: http://www.cjlimcgill.ca/

Chao-Jun "C.-J." Li, a Canadian chemist, is E. B. Eddy Professor of Chemistry, Distinguished James McGill Chair Professor, and Canada Research Chair in Green Chemistry at McGill University, Montréal. He is known for his pioneering works in Green Solvent (organic reactions in water) and Green Syntheses (water/functional group-tolerating organometallics, C-H activation, HOME Chemistry, and photochemistry).

== Education ==
C.-J. Li was born in 1963, and obtained his BSc from Zhengzhou University (1979–1983), and completed his MSc. in organic synthesis at the Chinese Academy of Sciences (1985–1988) remotely with Prof. T.H. Chan (McGill University). He then moved to McGill University (Montréal, Québec) to do his PhD (1989–1992) with Prof. T.H. Chan again (and discovered the indium-mediated allylation reaction in water) along with Prof. David Harpp (working on organosulfur/selenium/tellurium chemistry), and went on a NSERC-funded postdoc with Prof. Barry Trost at Stanford University in the United States (1992–1994) (and discovered the so-called phosphine-catalyzed γ-Addition Reaction).

== Career and research ==
C.-J. Li started as an assistant professor at Tulane University in 1994, and attained the title of Professor of Chemistry in 2000. He then moved in 2003 to McGill University, where he obtained a Canada Research Chair (Tier I) in Green Chemistry. He has also been the director of NSERC CREATE for Green Chemistry (2012–2018), the director of CFI Infrastructure for Green Chemistry and Green Chemicals (2008–2018) and has been the co-director of the FQRNT Center for Green Chemistry and Catalysis since 2009. He was the founding Co-Chair of the Canadian Green Chemistry and Engineering Network.

C.-J. Li's research encompasses various aspects of green chemistry applied to organic chemistry: organometallics, catalysis (thermal and light-based). Most notably, he is known for introducing water as a Green Solvent for various chemical reactions (C-H activation/Functionalization, Grignard type-reactions in water. Li originated the concepts of Aldehyde-Alkyne-Amine Coupling (A3 coupling reaction) and the cross dehydrogenative coupling (CDC Reaction, or C-H/C-H coupling, or oxidative C-H cross coupling). His work on GaN nanowires and nanoparticles as photocatalysts for the conversion of methane into benzene was covered by Phys.org in 2015, leaving prospects for hydrogen storage. Subsequently, his team showed that they were also able to convert methanol into ethanol, ethylene and cyclohexane. He also made breakthroughs in using hydrazones as organometallic surrogates in nucleophilic addition and cross-coupling, the direct amination of phenol derivatives. and the earliest report on fluorescence enhancement due to self-assembling (SAFE) in solution.

== Selected publications ==
Reactions in water:

- Indium-mediated allylations in water
- The Barbier–Grignard-type alkylation of aldehydes using unactivated alkyl iodides in water
- The Barbier–Grignard-type arylation of aldehydes using unactivated aryl iodides in water
- Silver-Catalyzed Hydrogenation of Aldehydes in Water

A3 coupling reaction

Cross dehydrogenative coupling(CDC)

GaN Photocatalysts

- Photoinduced conversion of methane into benzene over GaN nanowires
- Direct catalytic methanol-to-ethanol photoconversion via methyl carbene
- Direct catalytic conversion of methane into cyclohexane (Methane Liquefaction)
- Direct catalytic conversion of methane into methanol or formic acid
- Direct photo conversion of N2 and water into ammonia

Hydrazones as organo-metallic equivalent (HOME Chemistry):

- Carbonyls as alkyl carbanion equivalents for 1,2-nucleophilic additions, conjugate additions, and cross-couplings
