= Rolitetracycline =

Pharmaceutical drug

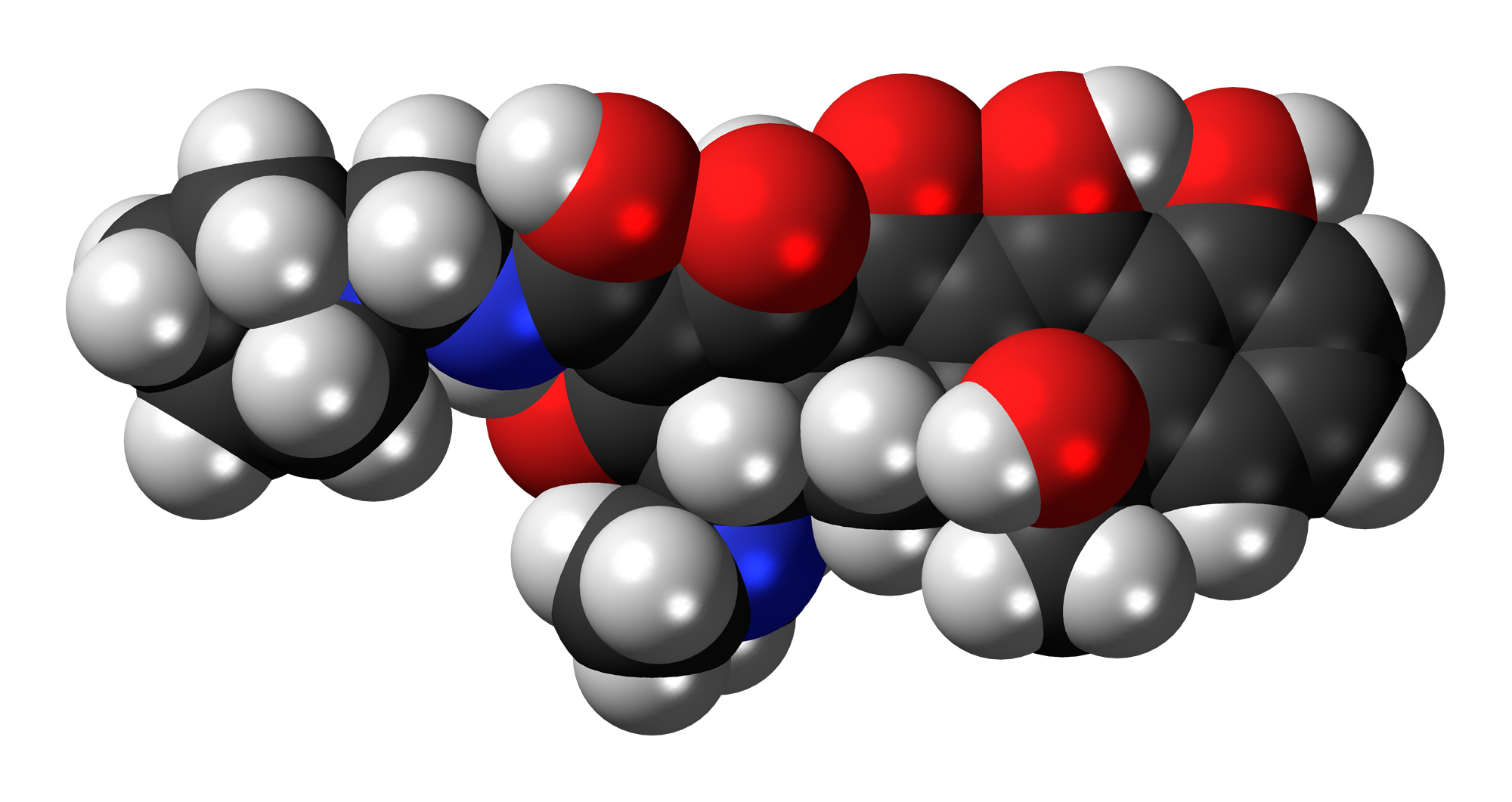

Clinical data
- Other names: (2Z,4S,4aS,5aS,6S,12aS)-4-Dimethylamino-6,10,11,12a-tetrahydroxy-2-[hydroxy-(pyrrolidin-1-ylmethylamino)methylidene]-6-methyl-4,4a,5,5a-tetrahydrotetracene-1,3,12-trione
- ATC code: J01AA09 (WHO)

Identifiers
- IUPAC name: (2Z,4S,4aS,5aS,6S,12aS)-4-(Dimethylamino)-6,10,11,12a-tetrahydroxy-2-{hydroxy[(pyrrolidin-1-ylmethyl)amino]methylene}-6-methyl-4a,5a,6,12a-tetrahydrotetracene-1,3,12(2H,4H,5H)-trione
- CAS Number: 751-97-3
- PubChem CID: 54682938
- DrugBank: DB01301
- ChemSpider: 10469507
- UNII: GH9IW85221
- KEGG: D02282
- ChEMBL: ChEMBL1214184
- CompTox Dashboard (EPA): DTXSID7023568
- ECHA InfoCard: 100.010.938

Chemical and physical data
- Formula: C_{27}H_{33}N_{3}O_{8}
- Molar mass: 527.574 g·mol^{−1}
- 3D model (JSmol): Interactive image
- SMILES: O=C(NCN1CCCC1)\C2=C(/O)[C@@H](N(C)C)[C@@H]3CC5C(=C(\O)[C@]3(O)C2=O)\C(=O)c4c(O)cccc4[C@@]5(C)O
- InChI: InChI=1S/C27H33N3O8/c1-26(37)13-7-6-8-16(31)17(13)21(32)18-14(26)11-15-20(29(2)3)22(33)19(24(35)27(15,38)23(18)34)25(36)28-12-30-9-4-5-10-30/h6-8,14-15,20,31,33-34,37-38H,4-5,9-12H2,1-3H3,(H,28,36)/t14?,15-,20-,26+,27-/m0/s1; Key:HMEYVGGHISAPJR-VQCPGFMQSA-N

Rolitetracycline is a tetracycline antibiotic. Tetracycline is N-Mannich base prodrug that is prepared from tetracycline by condensation with pyrrolidine and formaldehyde to produce rolitetracycline. Rolitetracycline is used as an antibacterial drug, a protein synthesis inhibitor, an antiprotozoal drug and a prodrug.
