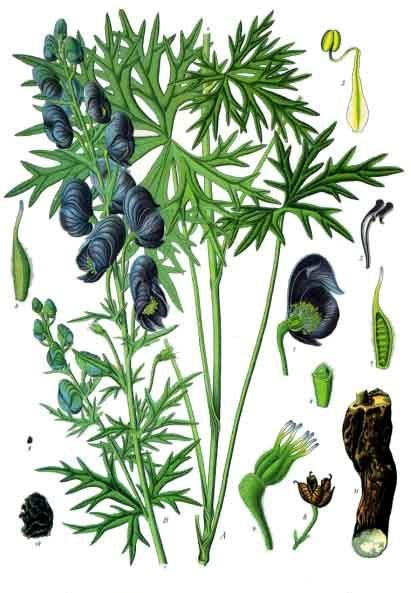

Scientific classification
- Kingdom: Plantae
- Clade: Tracheophytes
- Clade: Angiosperms
- Clade: Eudicots
- Order: Ranunculales
- Family: Ranunculaceae
- Genus: Aconitum
- Species: A. ferox

Binomial name
- Aconitum ferox Wall. ex Ser.

= Aconitum ferox =

Indian aconite

Species of plant

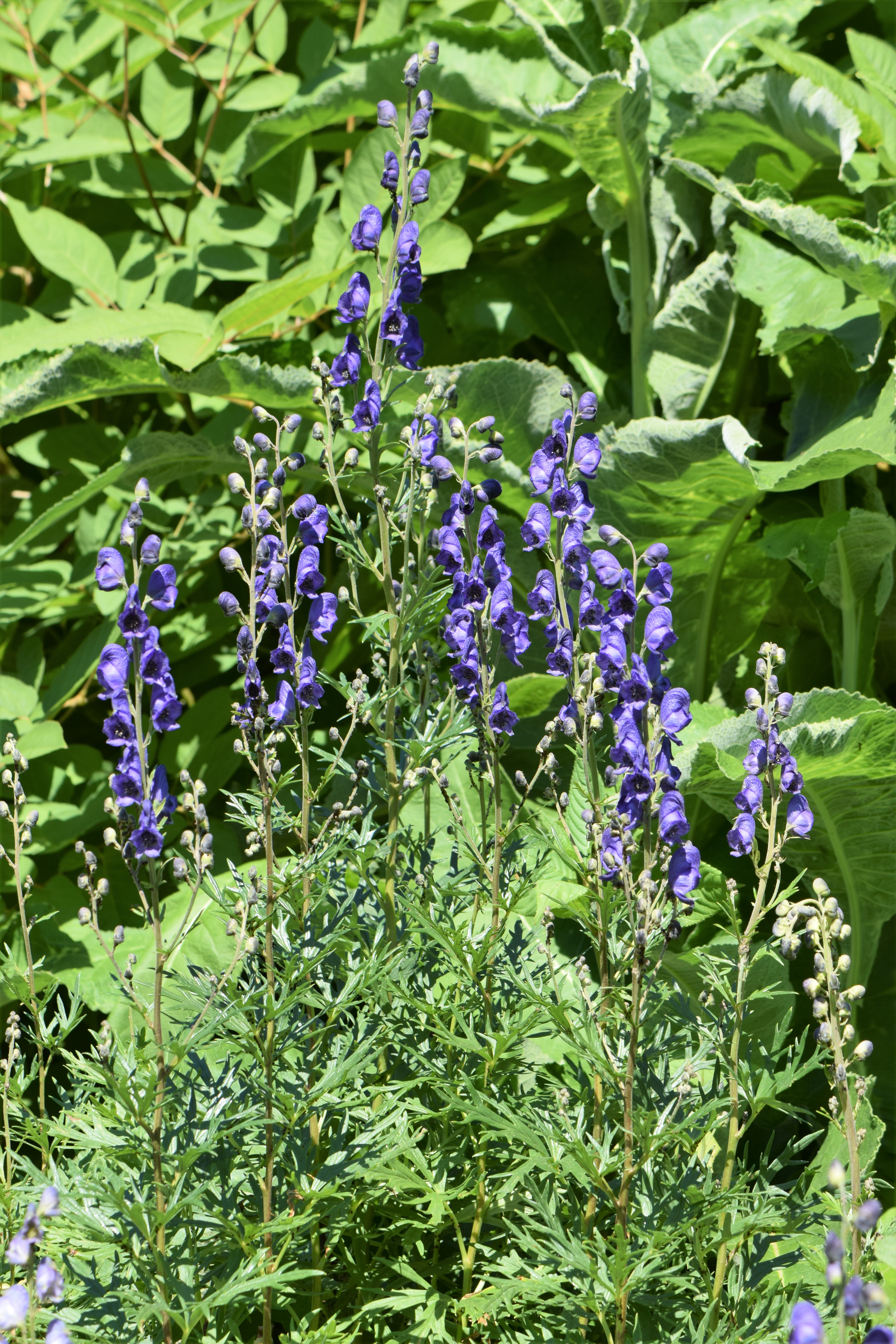
Aconitum ferox

Aconitum ferox (syn. A. virorum) is a member of the monkshood genus Aconitum of the Ranunculaceae. The common name by which it is most often known in English is Indian Aconite, while the Hindi names used by practitioners of Ayurveda include वत्सनाभ vatsanabha (= "root resembling the navel of a child") and महाविषा mahavisha (= "great poison").

A tuberous-rooted, herbaceous perennial reaching 1.0 metre tall by 0.5 metres wide and tolerant of many soil types, Aconitum ferox forms the principal source of the Indian poison known variously as bikh, bish, and nabee. It contains large quantities of the extremely toxic alkaloid pseudaconitine (also known as nepaline, after Nepal) and is considered to be the most poisonous plant found in the Himalaya.

The symptoms of poisoning usually appear 45 minutes to an hour after the consumption of a toxic dose and consist of numbness of the mouth and throat and vomiting. Respiration slows, with blood pressure falling synchronously, while the heart rate slows to 30-40 beats per minute. Consciousness characteristically remains unclouded until the end, which consists usually of death by asphyxiation, although occasionally of death due to cardiac arrest.

Monier-Williams lists it as one of the definitions of <bhRGga> or Bhringa.

== Range ==
The species is native to the eastern Himalayas from central Nepal eastward through the north of West Bengal, Sikkim, Bhutan and Arunachal Pradesh to Assam.

== Habitat ==
A. ferox grows at altitudes of 2,100-3,600m, favouring shrubberies and forest clearings. The flowering period is from August to October.

== Mountain named for species ==
The plant formerly grew abundantly at Sandakphu, which is a mountain peak (3636 m; 11,930 ft) in the Singalila Ridge, forms the highest point of the Darjeeling Hills and lies on the border between the Indian State of West Bengal and Nepal. Indeed, this former abundance is reflected in the name Sandakphu itself, which derives from the (Tibeto-Burman) Lepcha language and translates as "the height of the poisonous plant". Such was the danger of fatal poisoning to sheep and cattle being driven through the area that they had to be muzzled to prevent them grazing/browsing upon the extremely toxic A. ferox and certain toxic Rhododendron species which were also present.

== Medicinal use in Sikkim ==
With due caution in regard to its extreme potency and toxicity (and the consequent danger of overdose), the plant has long been used in the folk medicine (incorporating Ayurvedic and sometimes also homeopathic elements) of the Indian state of Sikkim on the southeastern edge of the Tibetan Plateau.

After unspecified "proper curing" aimed at "mitigation of the virulent poison" the drug prepared from the tuberous root is much used as an analgesic for the relief of chronic pain. Other properties attributed to the plant are those of being sudorific, diuretic, expectorant and antipyretic, while diseases and conditions in the treatment of which it has been employed include diabetes mellitus, asthma, ear infections, nasal infections, leprosy, paralysis and arthritis. Rai and Sharma note also that:

The root is also used as an antidote to hartal, believed to be a lethal poison of local origin.
Medicinal Plants of the Sikkim Himalaya

The word rendered here as hartal is referable to the Hindi word हरताल (= haratāla), having the same spelling in Devanagari as the Nepali word haratāla - both of which are archaic designations for minerals containing the poisonous element arsenic - particularly orpiment (i.e. naturally occurring arsenic trisulphide) and its associated realgar (tetraarsenic tetrasulfide). Regarding the local availability of ores of arsenic, the arsenical minerals arsenopyrite and jordanite are to be found in Sikkim in the Rangpo polymetallic deposit (Bhotang Mines) of Pakyong district, East Sikkim. A local need in Sikkim for a (perceived) antidote to poisoning by arsenic compounds may be explained by the frequent use of such compounds in combination with herbal medicines (believed to mitigate their toxicity) in the alchemical Ayurvedic practice known as Rasashastra.

== Folk belief in relation to altitude sickness ==
There is an (erroneous) belief in the folklore of Sikkim that the scent of the flowers of the upland species A. ferox is responsible for the incidence of altitude sickness in travellers normally inhabiting lowland areas who visit highland areas of the province. Medicine has established beyond doubt that altitude sickness is caused by altitude-related oxygen deprivation, centering around the alveolar gas equation. However, given the extreme toxicity of Aconitum ferox, it is not inconceivable that proximity to large numbers of flowering plants of the species might cause, not altitude sickness, but illness of some sort. Toxicity arising from the mere scent of the flowers is most unlikely, but inhalation of large quantities of the undoubtedly toxic pollen could provide a plausible mechanism for causing illness in travellers to areas where the species is especially plentiful - Jyothi et al. note that the "odor" of A. ferox has a "narcotic effect" and that exposure to its pollen can cause pain and swelling of the eyes. They note also that poisonings have occurred through accidental inhalation of dust from the powdered root during its preparation for medicinal purposes. Yet more plausibly, the contact of unprotected human skin with the juice of damaged plant tissues, caused by walking through a dense stand of the plant could undoubtedly lead to poisoning, since the alkaloids present in the notoriously toxic genus Aconitum can be absorbed through such skin - particularly if it be damaged.

== Dangerous ingredient of traditional alcoholic drinks ==
Plant material or extracts derived from various Aconitum spp. including A. ferox have, on occasion, been added in small quantities to Himalayan alcoholic drinks - notably the traditional beer known as Chhaang - to heighten their intoxicating effects, a dangerous practice which has not only caused drinkers to exhibit symptoms of poisoning, but also led occasionally to actual fatalities.

== Use as a (potentially lethal) Aghori entheogen ==
Aghori, left-hand path, tantric, Shaivites (devotees of the Hindu deity Shiva) smoke the dried roots of Aconitum ferox, combined in a mixture with cannabis flowers, in a practice that is part consciousness-expansion by entheogen, part ordeal by poison. Aghoris, no strangers to the use of all manner of dangerous drugs (such as Datura metel), warn of the extreme danger posed by smoking mixtures containing aconite, and restrict their use to the most experienced adepts of their particular school of Shaivism, as being potentially lethal. Drug-induced, altered states of consciousness comprise at least three elements : the effects of the drug upon the brain and body, set and setting. Given that Aghori tantrics are charnel ground ascetics who pursue moksha (spiritual liberation) in settings of extreme horror, venerate wrathful deities (principally Bhairava, his consort Bhairavi, Dhumavati and Bagalamukhi) and find in Aconitum ferox a drug with unpleasant somatic effects warning its users (rightly) of possible death, it is clear that the experience evoked by the smoking of Aconite in such circumstances is likely to be one of dysphoria (albeit dysphoria sought consciously, in pursuit of the deeper euphoria of advaita or realisation of the oneness of all being).

== Lakhvir Singh murder case ==
In 2010, the use of A. ferox as a criminal poison gained notoriety in the U.K. as a result of the murder trial of Lakhvir Singh, a Sikh woman from Southall. Singh was found guilty of the murder of her ex-lover, Lakhvinder Cheema, and the attempted murder of his fiancée, Gurjeet Choongh, with a curry spiked with bikh poison acquired from India. After consuming the poisoned curry, Cheema began to vomit and over the course of the next hour suffered total paralysis of all four limbs, blindness, a drastic fall in blood pressure, and heart failure, leading to his death within an hour of his admission to hospital. Choongh, having consumed less of the lethal dish, later recovered after being placed in an induced coma.
