= Polyetheramines =

Class of chemical compounds

Chemical structure of triethylene glycol diamine, one of the simplest polyetheramines

Polyetheramines are a group of chemicals that are aliphatic organic species based on both ether and amine groups. They are produced by reacting either ethylene oxide or propylene oxide with polyols and then aminating them. There are a number of commercially available molecules with different CAS numbers and molecular weights. They often come with a prefix of M, D or T for monofunctional, difunctional and trifunctional respectively. D-230 would mean difunctional with a molecular weight of 230. A key use is for curing epoxy resins.

== Applications ==
A key component of a Mannich base apart from formaldehyde and a phenolic species, is an amine. Polyetheramines can undergo the Mannich reaction and thus may be used to make Mannich bases.

=== Epoxy resin curatives ===
One of the primary uses of polyether amines is as an epoxy curing agent. They are commercially available as mono, di and tri-functional. Difunctional versions tend to give flexibility and thus toughness to epoxy resin systems. Studies have been done on the cured properties of epoxy systems using different functionality polyetheramines. As epoxy curatives, they may then be further formulated into CASE applications: coatings, adhesives, sealants, and elastomers.

=== Fuel additives ===
Sludge and other deposits build up in internal combustion engines especially gasoline powered versions. Fuel additives and detergents are thus often employed to help remove these or at least minimize them. Polyetheramines are one such additive.
