= A3 coupling reaction =

Chemical reaction

The A^{3} coupling (also known as A^{3} coupling reaction or the aldehyde-alkyne-amine reaction), coined by Prof. Chao-Jun Li of McGill University, is a type of multicomponent reaction involving an aldehyde, an alkyne and an amine which react to give a propargylamine.

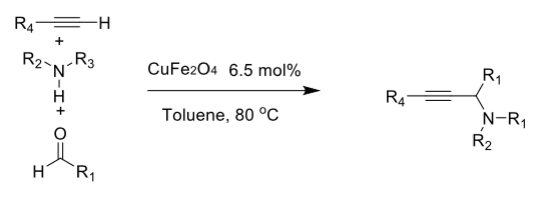

The reaction proceeds via direct dehydrative condensation and requires a metal catalyst, typically based on ruthenium/copper, gold or silver. Chiral catalyst can be used to give an enantioselective reaction, yielding a chiral amine. The solvent can be water. In the catalytic cycle the metal activates the alkyne to a metal acetylide, the amine and aldehyde combine to form an imine which then reacts with the acetylide in a nucleophilic addition. The reaction type was independently reported by three research groups in 2001 -2002; one report on a similar reaction dates back to 1953.

If the amine substituents have an alpha hydrogen present and provided a suitable zinc or copper catalyst is used, the A^{3} coupling product may undergo a further internal hydride transfer and fragmentation to give an allene in a Crabbé reaction.

== Decarboxylative A3 reaction ==
One variation is called the decarboxylative A^{3} coupling. In this reaction the amine is replaced by an amino acid. The imine can isomerise and the alkyne group is placed at the other available nitrogen alpha position. This reaction requires a copper catalyst. The redox A^{3} coupling has the same product outcome but the reactants are again an aldehyde, an amine and an alkyne as in the regular A^{3} coupling.
