= Chevron Cars =

Toy cars used as advertising mascots

The Chevron Cars are anthropomorphic vehicles who were part of an advertising campaign of the Chevron Corporation consisting of television spots, print ads, billboards, and toy cars available at Chevron retail locations.

== History ==
Their first introduction in television commercials on May 1, 1995, featured talking cars done in clay animation, with a variety of car colors each with different personalities. The commercials themselves, done in a similar fashion to the British animated film/television series Creature Comforts, were made by Aardman Animations and used to promote Chevron with Techron. A year later, Chevron fuel stations began selling the toy cars featured in the commercials. Chevron underestimated demand in 1997 and increased production to 700,000 on each of 4 or 5 new models at the time, compared to 500,000 in the past year.

Although originally designed for children, Chevron executives found that adults started collecting the toy plastic cars as well. Adults are among the collectors of the Chevron Cars.

On October 2, 2001, Chevron issued the limited-edition "Hope" car to raise awareness about the fight for a cure for breast cancer and raised about $300,000 in donations. This has been followed by a new breast cancer awareness each October through 2007 with profits going to relevant charities.

In 2007, Chevron began limited production of cars in association with major commercial sports and university teams based on their Victor E. Van car.

On July 26, 2011, Chevron announced that due to decreasing consumer demand, the production of the Chevron Cars would be discontinued. This brought to an end a period of 15 years in which they were produced and sold.

Car #	Car name	Released	Car info
1	Sam Sedan	May 1, 1996	A white sedan who always wants to stay shiny and clean and is watching the birds above.
2	Wendy Wagon	May 15, 1996	A turquoise station wagon who is always on the road from sunrise to sunset and is often known as the "winning wagon".
3	Tony Turbo	May 22, 1996	A red turbo car who zooms through the streets and sees everything.
4	Freddy 4-Wheeler	December 31, 1996	A green 4-wheeler that has mud splashes on his sides and two mountain bikes on his rack. He often goes out on mountain roads and loves getting dirty. #1-4 originally came out in "ice cream boxes" later ones were in bubble wrap containers.
5	Patty Patrol	June 19, 1997	A black and white police car who remains on the alert of patrolling the streets.
6	Tyler Taxi	June 23, 1997	A yellow taxi cab with the traditional black and white checkerboard colors of older New York Taxis. He cruises everywhere in town and sees new things.
7	Pete Pick-up	November 22, 1997	A blue pickup truck who works at the 10 Gallon Ranch, loading and unloading hay and horses from his trailer.
8	Horace n Trailer	November 25, 1997	A horse trailer that Pete Pick-Up often pulls. Horace is the name of the horse inside it.
9	Holly Hatchback	November 28, 1997	An orange hatchback car who works at stores around town.
10	Leslie LX	June 19, 1998	A creamy white luxury sedan, born in Beverly Hills, California, who contains fancy luxury designs.
11	Danni Driver	June 23, 1998	A pink student driver car who shows the learnings of driving.
12	Tina Turbo	November 15, 1998	A yellow turbo car who always likes to look and feel good. She also wants Tony Turbo to notice her, but has never succeeded.
13	Kelly Kompact	November 19, 1998	A green compact car who, like Leslie LX, was born in Beverly Hills, California and often gets into arguments with Leslie.
14	Cary Carrier	November 22, 1998	A blue and yellow car carrier who guides and delivers all Chevron cars to their performance needs.
15	Rudy Ragtop	May 1, 1999	A red Volkswagen Beetle ragtop car who came from Olden, Texas and despite being old, is still able to go everywhere.
16	Woody Wagon	May 15, 1999	A bright turquoise station wagon with the design of a 1950 Ford Country Squire, who carries a surfboard on his rack. He comes from San Diego, California and is into surfing.
17	CC Boat n Trailer	May 22, 1999	A trailer with a red wooden boat on it that is usually pulled by Woody Wagon.
18	Casey Coupe	November 19, 1999	A yellow coupe who came from Social Circle, Georgia and loves being in traffic.
19	Bailey Bouncer	November 22, 1999	The first young car produced, Bailey is yellow and came from Little Falls, Washington. She likes to bounce everywhere.
20	Brandon Bumper	November 24, 1999	The second young car produced, Brandon is green and also came from Little Falls. He wants everyone to bump into him.
21	Skyler Scamper	November 29, 1999	The third young car produced, Skyler is orange and also came from Little Falls. She likes to scamper through the sky.
22	Zachary Zoomer	November 30, 1999	The fourth young car produced, Zachary is purple and also came from Little Falls. He always wants to zoom through everything.
23	Nando	May 22, 2000	A red station wagon with a guitar case on his roof. He is always into music.
24	Frankie 4-Wheeler	November 15, 2000	A blue 4-wheeler with mud splashes on his sides, much like Freddy 4-Wheeler. Like Freddy, he loves going off-roading.
25	Leo Limo	November 22, 2000	A silver limousine who drives stars everywhere and contains more luxurious features than Leslie LX.
26	Hank Hotrod	May 1, 2001	A purple hot rod with flames painted on his front. Hank came from Hot Springs, Utah and loves getting hot stuff.
27	Della Deluxe	May 15, 2001	A light blue and white car who came from Grand Gulf, Mississippi and contains many grand features.
28	Sally Schoolbus	August 2, 2001	A yellow school bus who came from Bussey, Arizona, and always gets everyone to school.
29	Trevor Tow Truck	November 22, 2001	A yellow and blue tow truck who came from College Station, Texas and works at his own auto shop. He also loves music.
30	Pax Power	November 25, 2001	A purple car who came from Gasoline, Texas and has learned everything in his engine.
31	Charlie Chaser	November 28, 2002	The fifth young car produced, Charlie is blue and came from Little Falls like all the other young cars. He likes to chase everyone.
32	Dylan Dasher	November 29, 2002	The sixth young car produced, Dylan is pink and came from Little Falls. She likes to dash everywhere.
33	Chandler Chip	May 1, 2003	A green and white ice cream truck with an ice cream cone that rotates on his roof and plays "Pop Goes the Weasel". Chandler came from Chipley, Florida and he always keeps his ice cream chilled.
34	Summer Scoop	May 15, 2003	A brown and white ice cream truck who came from Roopville, Georgia and has the similar features of Chandler Chip, except playing "Turkey in the Straw" instead.
35	Riley Roadster	November 1, 2003	A red roadster with white on his hood. Riley came from New Roads, Louisiana and loves racing.
36	Maddie Mudster	May 22, 2004	A white car with big mud splashes and the words "Wash me" written on her sides. Maddie came from Mudville, Texas and likes getting muddy in the pigpen.
37	Payton Pizza	July 10, 2005	A red pizza delivery van with a pizza slice on his roof. Payton came from Pie Town, New Mexico and always wants to keep his pizzas hot when he delivers them.
38	Travis Tanker	November 25, 2005	A white tanker truck with the Chevron logo and some cars painted on his tank. Travis came from Gasoline Alley, Arizona and carries all the fuel for the cars.
39	Maria Minivan	June 23, 2006	A blue minivan with luggage on her rack. Maria came from Santa Maria, California and loves travelling through different scenery.
40	Hap E Camper	June 24, 2006	A white and blue camper trailer that is pulled by Maria Minivan, Freddy 4-Wheeler, Frankie 4-Wheeler, Woody Wagon, Pete Pickup, and Maddie Mudster.
41	Brent Blizzard	November 22, 2006	A red 4-wheeler with snow splashes on his side and snow boots on his rack. Brent came from Snowflake, Arizona and is the cousin of Freddy 4-Wheeler. He likes travelling off-road in the snow.
42	Fuller Fire Truck	November 22, 2008	A red fire engine who came from Rescue, California and is always on the scene of an emergency.
43	Moe Muscle	November 25, 2009	A blue muscle car with white stripes that go over his roof. Moe came from Muscle Shoals, Alabama and likes to stay tough, fast and fit.
44	Trent Techron	2020	A silver race car introduced for the 25th anniversary of Techron. Born in Silver Lake, Florida.
LE-1	Davey Driver	June 15, 1998	A green student driver car that has the same features as Danny Driver.
Numbered Series	Icon Car	December 31, 1999	A red sports car who wants to be the icon of the Chevron cars, was available only in the Family Fun Kit.
LE-2	Taylor Taxi	September 18, 2001	A golden taxi cab with the same checkboard stripes as on Tyler Taxi. Taylor came from Carefree, Arizona and likes going to different places.
OAK	Victor E. Van: Oakland Athletics	August 1, 2007	A dark gray minivan with Oakland Athletics stickers.
SF	Victor E. Van: San Francisco Giants	August 2, 2007	An orange minivan with San Francisco Giants stickers.
VEV-LA	Victor E. Van: Los Angeles Lakers	January 1, 2008	A purple minivan with Los Angeles Lakers stickers.
VEV-???	Victor E. Van: Arizona Cardinals	October 18, 2008	A red minivan with Arizona Cardinals stickers.
VEV-CA	Victor E. Van: California Angels	October 31, 2008	A red minivan with California Angels stickers.
VEV-UT	Victor E. Van: Jazz	November 15, 2008	A purple minivan with Utah Jazz stickers.
VEV-ASU	Victor E. Van: ASU (Arizona State University)	September 18, 2007	A dark red minivan with Arizona State University stickers.
VEV-UA	Victor E. Van: UA (University of Arizona)	September 30, 2007	A blue minivan with University of Arizona stickers.
VEV-UH	Victor E. Van: UH (University of Hawaii)	September 30, 2007	A green minivan with University of Hawaii stickers.
VEV-UNLV	Victor E. Van: UNLV (University of Las Vegas, Nevada)	September 30, 2007	A red minivan with University of Nevada, Las Vegas stickers.
VEV-USC	Victor E. Van: USC (University of Southern California)	September 30, 2007	A red minivan with University of Southern California stickers.
VEV-SDSU	Victor E. Van: SDSU (San Diego State University)	September 14, 2008	A bright red minivan with San Diego State University stickers.
VEV-PSU	Victor E. Van: PSU (Portland State University)	September 18, 2008	A green minivan with Portland State University stickers.
VEV-TAMU	Victor E. Van: Texas A&M University	October 2, 2008	A dark red minivan with Texas A&M University stickers.
VEV-BYU	Victor E. Van: Brigham Young University	October 14, 2008	A dark blue minivan with BYU stickers.
VEV-PENN	Victor E. Van: Penn State University	October 18, 2008	A black minivan with Penn State stickers.
VEV-ORE	Victor E. Van: Oregon University	October 31, 2008	A green minivan with Oregon Ducks stickers.
VEV-WU	Victor E. Van: University of Washington	October 31, 2008	A purple minivan with University of Washington stickers.
VEV-CAL	Victor E. Van: University of California, Berkeley	October 31, 2008	A blue minivan with Cal stickers.
VEV-GU	Victor E. Van: GU (Gonzaga University)	November 2, 2008	A violet minivan with Gonzaga University stickers.
SE-1	Hope 2001	October 2, 2001	A pink car who came from Sisters, Oregon and knows what one needs. there was no date on the packaging.
SE-2	Hope 2002	October 18, 2002	A pink car who came from the same town of Hope 2001 and knows the key to feeling good.
SE-3	Hope 2003	October 14, 2003	A pink car with a silver stripe in the center. Hope 2003 has the same features as Hope 2001 and Hope 2002.
SE-4	Faith	October 31, 2004	A brown car who has the same features of Hope 2001, Hope 2002 and Hope 2003.
SE-5	Cherish	October 31, 2005	A red car who came from Friendship, Tennessee and is always into friendship.
SE-6	Promise	October 14, 2006	A pink and white car who came from Devotion, North Carolina and has similar features of Cherish.
SE-7	Courage	October 18, 2007	A darker pink car who came from Challenge, California and contains the same features of other Limited Edition cars.
SE-8	Spirit	October 14, 2008	A lighter pink car who came from Spirit Lake, Idaho and has many of the same features of the other Limited Edition cars.
SE-9	Devotion	October 18, 2009	A pink car who came from Niceville, Florida and is always devoted to the big picture.
SE-10	Harmonee	October 1, 2010	A light pink minivan who came from Harmony, California and loves harmonious things.
Autopia-1	Classic	June 19, 2000	The yellow autopia car who is proud of being the oldest one in Disneyland.
Autopia-2	Dusty	June 23, 2000	The gray autopia car who likes to go off-roading which has made him a cousin of Freddy and Frankie 4-Wheelers.
Autopia-3	Suzy	June 29, 2000	The red autopia car who likes to get upbeat around town.
Autopia-4	Sparky	June 30, 2000	The purple autopia car who always wants to do his best on the track.
Autopia-5	Gold Dusty	June 30, 2000	A golden version Dusty that was produced to commemorate the reopening of the Chevron sponsored Autopia in Disneyland.

== Credits ==
The television ads were designed by advertising agency Young and Rubicam. The internet strategy, digital brand extension and the ecommerce component was created and managed by San Francisco web developer ISL Consulting, now part of ClearMetrics, Inc. ISL Consulting also developed the original Chevron.com corporate website as well as numerous other web-based initiatives for the various Chevron operating companies.

== Popular culture ==
The Chevron Cars television ads have been parodied in several television shows, including Robot Chicken, the FOX animated comedy Family Guy (episode "Deep Throats"), Futurama (episode "The Prince and the Product"), and a MADtv sketch in which one of the cars gets fitted with a bomb and explodes after asking questions about the ticking.

== See also ==
- Cars - A franchise by Disney-Pixar featuring anthropomorphic vehicles, with their eyes being on the windows.
