= Aconitine =

Toxic plant alkaloid

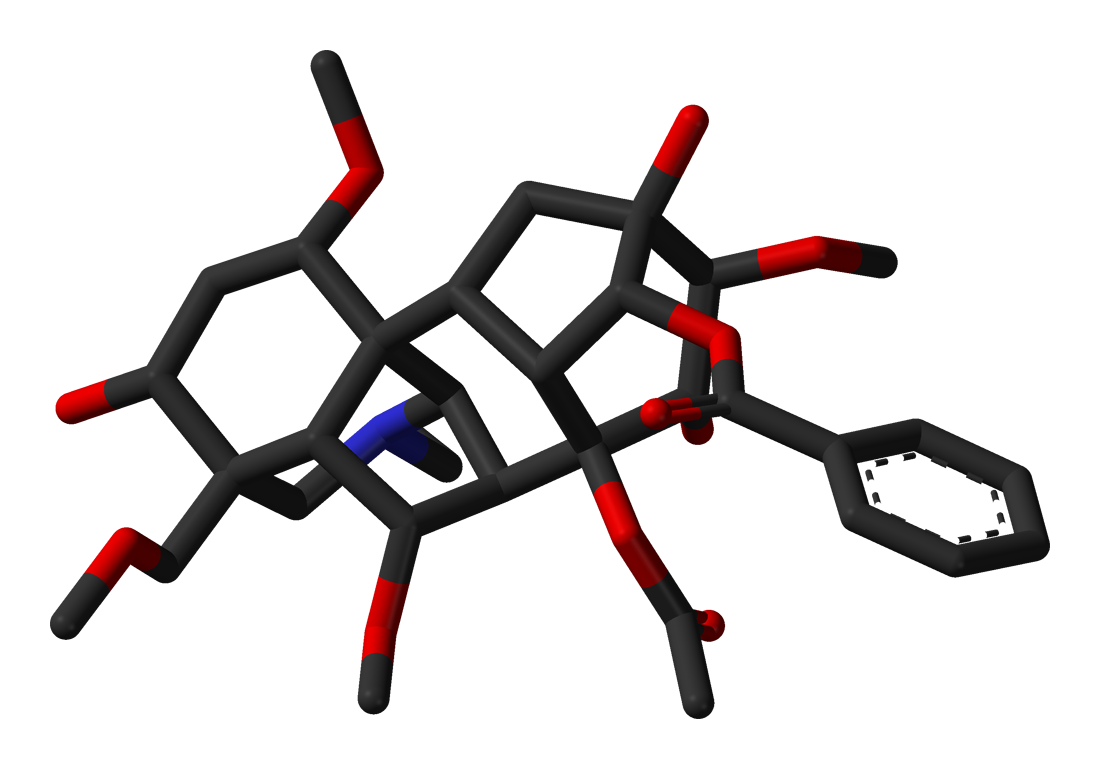

Names
- IUPAC name 8-(acetyloxy)-20-ethyl-3α,13,15-trihydroxy-1α,6α,16β-trimethoxy-4-(methoxymethyl)aconitan-14α-yl benzoate
- Other names Acetylbenzoylaconine

Identifiers
CAS Number	302-27-2
3D model (JSmol)	Interactive image; Interactive image
ChEBI	CHEBI:2430
ChEMBL	ChEMBL2103747
ChemSpider	214292
ECHA InfoCard	100.005.566
EC Number	206-121-7
IUPHAR/BPS	2617
KEGG	C06091
PubChem CID	245005
UNII	X8YN71D5WC
CompTox Dashboard (EPA)	DTXSID4046319
- InChI: InChI=1S/C34H47NO11/c1-7-35-15-31(16-41-3)20(37)13-21(42-4)33-19-14-32(40)28(45-30(39)18-11-9-8-10-12-18)22(19)34(46-17(2)36,27(38)29(32)44-6)23(26(33)35)24(43-5)25(31)33/h8-12,19-29,37-38,40H,7,13-16H2,1-6H3/t19-,20-,21+,22-,23+,24+,25-,26?,27+,28-,29+,31+,32-,33+,34-/m1/s1 Key: XFSBVAOIAHNAPC-XTHSEXKGSA-N; InChI=1/C34H47NO11/c1-7-35-15-31(16-41-3)20(37)13-21(42-4)33-19-14-32(40)28(45-30(39)18-11-9-8-10-12-18)22(19)34(46-17(2)36,27(38)29(32)44-6)23(26(33)35)24(43-5)25(31)33/h8-12,19-29,37-38,40H,7,13-16H2,1-6H3/t19-,20-,21+,22-,23+,24+,25-,26?,27+,28-,29+,31+,32-,33+,34-/m1/s1 Key: XFSBVAOIAHNAPC-XTHSEXKGBF
- SMILES: COC[C@]12CN(C)[C@@H]3[C@H]4[C@H](OC)C1[C@@]3([C@H](C[C@H]2O)OC)[C@@H]5C[C@]6(O)[C@@H](OC)[C@H](O)[C@@]4(OC(C)=O)[C@H]5C6OC(=O)c7ccccc7; O=C(O[C@H]5[C@]3(O)C[C@H]4[C@@]16C2N(CC)C[C@]([C@H]1[C@@H](OC)[C@@H]2[C@@](OC(=O)C)([C@@H](O)[C@@H]3OC)[C@H]45)(COC)[C@H](O)C[C@@H]6OC)c7ccccc7

Properties
Chemical formula	C_{34}H_{47}NO_{11}
Molar mass	645.73708
Appearance	solid
Melting point	203 to 204 °C (397 to 399 °F; 476 to 477 K)
Solubility in water	0.3 g/L
Solubility in ethanol	35 g/L

Hazards
- GHS labelling
Pictograms	(GHS06: Toxic)
Signal word	Danger
Hazard statements	H300, H330
Precautionary statements	P260, P264, P270, P271, P284, P301+P310, P304+P340, P310, P320, P321, P330, P403+P233, P405, P501
- Lethal dose or concentration (LD, LC)
LD_{50} (median dose)	0.166 mg/kg (mouse, intravenous); 0.328 mg/kg (mouse, intraperitoneal); 1 mg/kg (mouse, oral)
- Except where otherwise noted, data are given for materials in their standard state (at 25 °C [77 °F], 100 kPa). verify (what is ?) Infobox references

Aconitine is an alkaloid toxin produced by various plant species belonging to the genus Aconitum (family Ranunculaceae), commonly known by the names wolfsbane and monkshood. Aconitine is notorious for its toxic properties.

== Structure and reactivity ==
Biologically active isolates from Aconitum and Delphinium plants are classified as norditerpenoid alkaloids, which are further subdivided based on the presence or absence of the C18 carbon. Aconitine is a C19-norditerpenoid, based on its presence of this C18 carbon. It is barely soluble in water, but very soluble in organic solvents such as chloroform or diethyl ether. Aconitine is also soluble in mixtures of alcohol and water if the concentration of alcohol is high enough.

Like many other alkaloids, the basic nitrogen atom in one of the six-membered ring structures of aconitine can easily form salts and ions, giving it affinity for both polar and lipophilic structures (such as cell membranes and receptors) and making it possible for the molecule to pass the blood–brain barrier. The acetoxyl group at the c8 position can readily be replaced by a methoxy group, by heating aconitine in methanol, to produce 8-deacetyl-8-O-methyl derivatives. If aconitine is heated in its dry state, it undergoes pyrolysis to form pyroaconitine ((1α,3α,6α,14α,16β)-20-ethyl-3,13-dihydroxy-1,6,16-trimethoxy-4-(methoxymethyl)-15-oxoaconitan-14-yl benzoate) with the chemical formula C_{32}H_{43}NO_{9}.

== Mechanism of action ==
Aconitine can interact with the voltage-dependent sodium-ion channels, which are transmembrane proteins in the cell membranes of excitable tissues, such as cardiac and skeletal muscles and neurons, resulting in the cells becoming non-excitable, and thus, paralysed. These proteins are highly selective for sodium ions. They open to quickly depolarize the cell membrane, causing the upstroke of an action potential. Normally, the sodium channels close again very rapidly, but the action potential causes the opening of potassium channels and potassium efflux, which results in repolarization of the membrane.

Aconitine binds to the channel at the neurotoxin binding site 2 on the alpha subunit (the same site bound by batrachotoxin, veratridine, and grayanotoxin). This binding results in a sodium-ion channel that stays open longer. Aconitine suppresses the conformational change in the sodium-ion channel from the active state to the inactive state. The membrane stays depolarized due to the constant sodium influx (which is 10–1000-fold greater than the potassium efflux). As a result, the membrane cannot be repolarized. The binding of aconitine to the channel also leads to the channel to change conformation from the inactive state to the active state at a more negative voltage. In neurons, aconitine increases the permeability of the membrane for sodium ions, resulting in a huge sodium influx in the axon terminal. As a result, the membrane depolarizes rapidly. Due to the strong depolarization, the permeability of the membrane for potassium ions increases rapidly, resulting in a potassium reflux to release the positive charge out of the cell. Not only the permeability for potassium ions but also the permeability for calcium ions increases as a result of the depolarization of the membrane. A calcium influx takes place. The increase of the calcium concentration in the cell stimulates the release of the neurotransmitter acetylcholine into the synaptic cleft. Acetylcholine binds to acetylcholine receptors at the postsynaptic membrane to open the sodium-channels there, generating a new action potential.

Research with mouse nerve-hemidiaphragm muscle preparation indicate that at low concentrations (<0.1 μM) aconitine increases the electrically evoked acetylcholine release causing an induced muscle tension. Action potentials are generated more often at this concentration. At higher concentration (0.3–3 μM) aconitine decreases the electrically evoked acetylcholine release, resulting in a decrease in muscle tension. At high concentration (0.3–3 μM), the sodium-ion channels are constantly activated, transmission of action potentials is suppressed, leading to non-excitable target cells or paralysis.

== Biosynthesis and total synthesis of related alkaloids ==
Aconitine is biosynthesized by the monkshood plant via the terpenoid biosynthesis pathway (MEP chloroplast pathway). Approximately 700 naturally occurring C19-diterpenoid alkaloids have been isolated and identified, but the biosynthesis of only a few of these alkaloids are well understood.

Likewise, only a few alkaloids of the aconitine family have been synthesized in the laboratory. In particular, despite over one hundred years having elapsed since its isolation, the prototypical member of its family of norditerpenoid alkaloids, aconitine itself, represents a rare example of a well-known natural product that has yet to succumb to efforts towards its total synthesis. The challenge that aconitine poses to synthetic organic chemists is due to both the intricate interlocking hexacyclic ring system that makes up its core and the elaborate collection of oxygenated functional groups at its periphery. A handful of simpler members of the aconitine alkaloids, however, have been prepared synthetically. In 1971, the Weisner group discovered the total synthesis of talatisamine (a C19-norditerpenoid). In the subsequent years, they also discovered the total syntheses of other C19-norditerpenoids, such as chasmanine, and 13-deoxydelphonine.

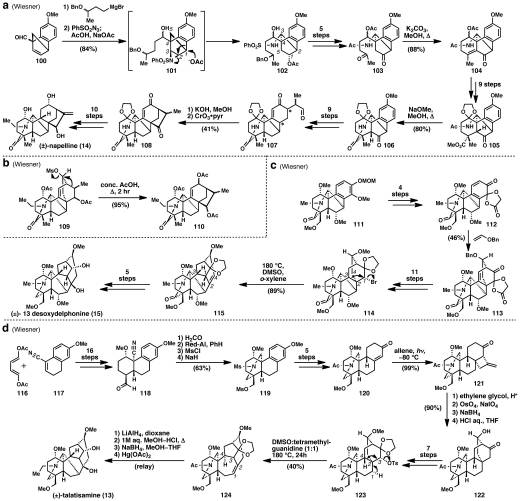
Schematic for the Wiesner Syntheses of Napelline. Deoxydelphonine and Talatisamine

The total synthesis of napelline (Scheme a) begins with aldehyde 100. In a 7 step process, the A-ring of napelline is formed (104). It takes another 10 steps to form the lactone ring in the pentacyclic structure of napelline (106). An additional 9 steps creates the enone-aldehyde 107. Heating in methanol with potassium hydroxide causes an aldol condensation to close the sixth and final ring in napelline (14). Oxidation then gives rise to diketone 108 which was converted to (±)-napelline (14) in 10 steps.

A similar process is demonstrated in Karel Wiesner's synthesis of 13-desoxydelphinone (Scheme c). The first step of this synthesis is the generation of a conjugated dienone 112 from 111 in 4 steps. This is followed by the addition of a benzyl vinyl ether to produce 113. In 11 steps, this compound is converted to ketal 114. The addition of heat, DMSO and o-xylene rearranges this ketol (115), and after 5 more steps (±)-13-desoxydelphinone (15) is formed.

Lastly, talatisamine (Scheme d) is synthesized from diene 116 and nitrile 117. The first step is to form tricycle 118 in 16 steps. After another 6 steps, this compound is converted to enone 120. Subsequently, this allene is added to produce photoadduct 121. This adduct group is cleaved and rearrangement gives rise to the compound 122. In 7 steps, this compound forms 123, which is then rearranged, in a similar manner to compound 114, to form the aconitine-like skeleton in 124. A racemic relay synthesis is completed to produce talatisamine (13).

More recently, the laboratory of the late David Y. Gin completed the total syntheses of the aconitine alkaloids nominine and neofinaconitine.

== Metabolism ==
Aconine: an amorphous, bitter, non-poisonous alkaloid, derived from the decomposition of aconitine

Aconitine is metabolized by cytochrome P450 isozymes (CYPs). There has been research in 2011 in China to investigate in-depth the CYPs involved in aconitine metabolism in human liver microsomes. It has been estimated that more than 90 percent of currently available human drug metabolism can be attributed to eight main enzymes (CYP 1A2, 2C9, 2C8, 2C19, 2D6, 2E1, 3A4, 3A5). The researchers used recombinants of these eight different CYPs and incubated it with aconitine. To initiate the metabolism pathway the presence of NADPH was needed. Six CYP-mediated metabolites (M1–M6) were found by liquid chromatography, these six metabolites were characterized by mass-spectrometry. The six metabolites and the involved enzymes are summarized in the following table:

Metabolite	Name	Involved CYPs
M1	O-Demethyl-aconitine	CYP3A4, CYP3A5, CYP2D6, CYP2C8
M2	16-O-Demethyl-aconitine	CYP3A4, CYP3A5, CYP2D6, CYP2C9
M3	N-deethyl-aconitine	CYP3A4, CYP3A5, CYP2D6, CYP2C9
M4	O-didemethyl-aconitine	CYP3A5, CYP2D6
M5	3-Dehydrogen-aconitine	CYP3A4, CYP3A5
M6	Hydroxyl-aconitine	CYP3A5, CYP2D6

Selective inhibitors were used to determine the involved CYPs in the aconitine metabolism. The results indicate that aconitine was mainly metabolized by CYP3A4, 3A5 and 2D6. CYP2C8 and 2C9 had a minor role to the aconitine metabolism, whereas CYP1A2, 2E1 and 2C19 did not produce any aconitine metabolites at all. The proposed metabolic pathways of aconitine in human liver microsomes and the CYPs involved to it are summarized in the table above.

== Uses ==
Aconitine was previously used as an antipyretic and analgesic and still has some limited application in herbal medicine, although the narrow therapeutic index makes calculating appropriate dosage difficult.

In Ming China, iron tools with aconitine residue from the tomb of a doctor named Xia Quan (1348–1411 CE) suggests the use of wolfsbane as anesthetic. Aconitine is also present in Yunnan Baiyao, a proprietary traditional Chinese medicine.

== Toxicity ==
Consuming as little as 2 milligrams of pure aconitine or 1 gram of the plant itself may cause death by paralyzing respiratory or heart functions. Toxicity may occur through the skin; even touching the flowers can numb finger tips.

The toxic effects of aconitine have been tested in a variety of animals, including mammals (dog, cat, guinea pig, mouse, rat and rabbit), frogs and pigeons. Depending on the route of exposure, the observed toxic effects were local anesthetic effect, diarrhea, convulsions, arrhythmias or death. According to a review of different reports of aconite poisoning in humans, the following clinical features were observed:

- Neurological: paresthesia and numbness of face, perioral area and four limbs; muscle weakness in four limbs
- Cardiovascular: hypotension, palpitations, chest pain, bradycardia, sinus tachycardia, ventricular ectopics and other arrhythmias, ventricular arrhythmias, and junctional rhythm
- Gastrointestinal: nausea, vomiting, abdominal pain, and diarrhea
- Others: dizziness, hyperventilation, sweating, difficulty breathing, confusion, headache, and lacrimation

Progression of symptoms: the first symptoms of aconitine poisoning appear approximately 20 minutes to 2 hours after oral intake and include paresthesia, sweating and nausea. This leads to severe vomiting, colicky diarrhea, intense pain and then paralysis of the skeletal muscles. Following the onset of life-threatening arrhythmia, including ventricular tachycardia and ventricular fibrillation, death finally occurs as a result of respiratory paralysis or cardiac arrest.

Technical data on lethal doses

LD_{50} values for mice are 1 mg/kg orally, 0.100 mg/kg intravenously, 0.270 mg/kg intraperitoneally and 0.270 mg/kg subcutaneously. The lowest published lethal dose (LDLo) for mice is 1 mg/kg orally and 0.100 mg/kg intraperitoneally. The lowest published toxic dose (TDLo) for mice is 0.0549 mg/kg subcutaneously. LD50 value for rats is 0.064 mg/kg intravenously. The LDLo for rats is 0.040 mg/kg intravenously and 0.250 mg/kg intraperitoneally. The TDLo for rats is 0.040 mg/kg parenterally. For an overview of more test animal results (LD50, LDLo and TDLo) see the following table.

Species observed	Type of test	Route of exposure	Dose data (mg/kg)	Toxic effects
Human	LDLo	Oral	0.028	Behavioral: excitement Gastrointestinal: hypermotility, diarrhea Gastrointestinal: other changes
Human	LDLo	Oral	0.029	Details of toxic effects not reported other than lethal dose value
Cat	LD_{50}	Intravenous	0.080	Behavioral: convulsions or effect on seizure threshold
Cat	LDLo	Subcutaneous	0.100	Details of toxic effects not reported other than lethal dose value
Guinea pig	LD_{50}	Intravenous	0.060	Behavioral: convulsions or effect on seizure threshold
Guinea pig	LDLo	Subcutaneous	0.050	Details of toxic effects not reported other than lethal dose value
Guinea pig	LDLo	Intravenous	0.025	Cardiac: arrhythmias (including changes in conduction)
Mouse	LD_{50}	Intraperitoneal	0.270	Details of toxic effects not reported other than lethal dose value
Mouse	LD_{50}	Intravenous	0.100	Sense Organs and Special Senses (Eye): lacrimation Behavioral: convulsions or effect on seizure threshold Lungs, Thorax, or Respiration: dyspnea
Mouse	LD_{50}	Oral	1	Details of toxic effects not reported other than lethal dose value
Mouse	LD_{50}	Subcutaneous	0.270	Details of toxic effects not reported other than lethal dose value
Mouse	LDLo	Intraperitoneal	0.100	Details of toxic effects not reported other than lethal dose value
Mouse	LDLo	Oral	1	Behavioral: convulsions or effect on seizure threshold Cardiac: arrhythmias (including changes in conduction) Gastrointestinal: hypermotility, diarrhea
Mouse	TDLo	Subcutaneous	0.0549	Peripheral Nerve and Sensation: local anesthetic Behavioral: analgesia
Rabbit	LDLo	Subcutaneous	0.131	Details of toxic effects not reported other than lethal dose value
Rat	LD_{50}	Intravenous	0.080	Behavioral: convulsions or effect on seizure threshold
Rat	LD_{50}	Intravenous	0.064	Details of toxic effects not reported other than lethal dose value
Rat	LDLo	Intraperitoneal	0.250	Cardiac: other changes Lungs, Thorax, or Respiration: dyspnea
Rat	LDLo	Intravenous	0.040	Cardiac: arrhythmias (including changes in conduction)
Rat	TDLo	Parenteral	0.040	Cardiac: arrhythmias (including changes in conduction)
Frog	LDLo	Subcutaneous	0.586	Details of toxic effects not reported other than lethal dose value
Pigeon	LDLo	Subcutaneous	0.066	Details of toxic effects not reported other than lethal dose value

- Note that LD_{50} means lethal dose, 50 percent kill; LDLo means lowest published lethal dose; TDLo means lowest published toxic dose

For humans the lowest published oral lethal dose of 28 μg/kg was reported in 1969.

== Diagnosis and treatment ==
For the analysis of the Aconitum alkaloids in biological specimens such as blood, serum and urine, several GC-MS methods have been described. These employ a variety of extraction procedures followed by derivatisation to their trimethylsilyl derivatives. New sensitive HPLC-MS methods have been developed as well, usually preceded by SPE purification of the sample. The antiarrhythmic drug lidocaine has been reported to be an effective treatment of aconitine poisoning of a patient. Considering the fact that aconitine acts as an agonist of the sodium channel receptor, antiarrhythmic agents which block the sodium channel (Vaughan-Williams' classification I) might be the first choice for the therapy of aconitine induced arrhythmias. Animal experiments have shown that the mortality of aconitine is lowered by tetrodotoxin. The toxic effects of aconitine were attenuated by tetrodotoxin, probably due to their mutual antagonistic effect on excitable membranes. Also paeoniflorin seems to have a detoxifying effect on the acute toxicity of aconitine in test animals. This may result from alternations of pharmacokinetic behavior of aconitine in the animals due to the pharmacokinetic interaction between aconitine and paeoniflorin. In addition, in emergencies, one can wash the stomach using either tannic acid or powdered charcoal. Heart stimulants such as strong coffee or caffeine may also help until professional help is available.

== Famous poisonings ==
During the assault on Khaybar in 628, Bishir Ibn al-Bara, the companion of the Prophet Muhammad, was poisoned by Zaynab bint Al-Harith with a lamb leg and quickly died. The effects of the poison (death within 30 minutes, visible inflammation of the palate) is consistent with acute Aconitine poisoning.

During the Indian Rebellion of 1857, a British detachment was the target of attempted poisoning with aconitine by the Indian regimental cooks. The plot was thwarted by John Nicholson who, having detected the plot, interrupted the British officers just as they were about to consume the poisoned meal. The chefs refused to taste their own preparation, whereupon it was force-fed to a monkey who "expired on the spot". The cooks were hanged.

Aconitine was the poison used by George Henry Lamson in 1881 to murder his brother-in-law in order to secure an inheritance. Lamson had learned about aconitine as a medical student from professor Robert Christison, who had taught that it was undetectable—but forensic science had improved since Lamson's student days.

Rufus T. Bush, American industrialist and yachtsman, died on September 15, 1890, after accidentally taking a fatal dose of aconite.

In 1953 aconitine was used by a Soviet biochemist and poison developer, Grigory Mairanovsky, in experiments with prisoners in the secret NKVD laboratory in Moscow. He admitted killing around 10 people using the poison.

In 2004 Canadian actor Andre Noble died from aconitine poisoning. He accidentally ate some monkshood while he was on a hike with his aunt in Newfoundland.

In 2009 Lakhvir Singh of Feltham, west London, used aconitine to poison the food of her ex-lover Lakhvinder Cheema (who died as a result of the poisoning) and his current fiancée Gurjeet Choongh. Singh received a life sentence with a 23-year minimum for the murder on February 10, 2010.

In 2022, twelve diners at a restaurant in York Region became acutely ill following a meal. All twelve became seriously ill and four of them were admitted to the intensive care unit after the suspected poisoning.

== In popular culture ==
Aconitine was a favorite poison in the ancient world. The poet Ovid, referring to the proverbial dislike of stepmothers for their step-children, writes:

Lurida terribiles miscent aconita novercae.

Fearsome stepmothers mix lurid aconites.

Aconitine was also made famous by its use in Oscar Wilde's 1891 story "Lord Arthur Savile's Crime". Deceptive administration of experimentally-therapeutic aconitine is central to the murder accusation that motivates the main characters of Grant Allen’s Hilda Wade. Aconite also plays a prominent role in James Joyce's Ulysses, in which the father to protagonist Leopold Bloom used pastilles of the chemical to commit suicide. Aconitine poisoning plays a key role in the murder mystery Breakdown by Jonathan Kellerman (2016). In Twin Peaks season 3 part 13, aconitine is suggested as a means to poison the main character.

Monk's Hood is the name of the third Cadfael novel written in 1980 by Ellis Peters. The novel was made into an episode of the television series Cadfael starring Derek Jacobi.

In the third season of the Netflix series You, two of the main characters poison each other with aconitine. One survives (due to a lower dose and an antidote), and the other is killed.

Hannah McKay (Yvonne Strahovski), a serial killer in the Showtime series Dexter uses aconite on at least three occasions to poison her victims.

In season 2 episode 16 of the series Person Of Interest, aconitine is shown in a syringe stuck to the character Shaw (Sarah Shahi) nearly being injected and causing her death, until she is rescued by Reese (Jim Caviezel).

In a 2017 episode of The Doctor Blake Mysteries, fight manager Gus Jansons (Steve Adams) murdered his boxer, Mickey Ellis (Trey Coward), during a match by applying aconitine he had put in petroleum jelly and applying it to a cut over the boxer's eye. He feared being blackmailed over a murder he helped cover up. He had made the poison from wolfsbane he had seen in a local garden.

Aconitine poisoning is used by Villanelle to kill the Ukrainian gangster, Rinat Yevtukh in Killing Eve: No Tomorrow by Luke Jennings (2018).

The Marlow Murder Club episode (season 3, episodes 1 & 2 ) The Queen of Poisons

== See also ==
- Pseudaconitine
- Tetrodotoxin, a sodium channel blocker
