= Karel Wiesner =

Canadian chemist

Karel Wiesner FRS FRSC OC
- Karel Wiesner
- Born: Karel František Wiesner; November 25, 1919; Prague, Czechoslovakia
- Died: November 28, 1986 (aged 67); Fredericton, New Brunswick, Canada
- Citizenship: Canada
- Education: RNDr (1945)
- Alma mater: Charles University
- Known for: alkaloids, cardiac glycosides
- Spouse: Blanka Pevna
- Awards: CIC Medal (1963); Order of Canada (1975); Centenary Prize (1976); Ernest Guenther Award (1983); Killam Prize (1986)
- Scientific career
- Fields: organic chemistry
- Institutions: University of New Brunswick
- Academic advisors: Rudolf Brdička; Vladimir Prelog

Karel František Wiesner FRS FRSC OC (November 25, 1919 – November 28, 1986) was a Canadian chemist of Czech origin known for his contributions to the chemistry of natural products, notably aconitum alkaloids and digitalis glycosides.

== Early life and career ==
He was born in Prague, Czechoslovakia, into a family of some wealth and notability. His undergraduate education began in 1938 when he enrolled to study natural sciences at Charles University. His studies were interrupted the following year when universities were shuttered under the German occupation. Working under the supervision of Rudolf Brdička at Bulovka Hospital, and in a rudimentary laboratory in the basement of his parental home, he discovered a polarographic method of measuring fast chemical reactions. He was awarded a doctorate for this research when Charles University reopened in 1945.

In 1943, he joined a research group at the Fragner pharmaceutical company near Prague that was working to develop a penicillin variant. Despite working in secrecy and isolation under onerous wartime restrictions, the group managed to first separate and then test an antimicrobial drug. Wiesner's role included ensuring an adequate supply of the antibiotic by extracting and purifying the substance from the test subject's urine following treatment.

From 1946 until 1948 he conducted postgraduate research in organic chemistry under Vladimir Prelog at ETH, Zürich, funded by a Rockefeller fellowship. Wiesner immigrated to Canada in 1948 to take up a position at the University of New Brunswick, Fredericton. Apart from a two-year spell with the pharmaceutical company Ayerst in Montreal, he remained at UNB for the remainder of his career. In 1981, Wiesner became a founding member of the World Cultural Council. He died of lymphoma in 1986.

== Scientific achievements ==
Wiesner made remarkable contributions to the structural and synthetic chemistry of complex polysubstituted polycyclic natural products. In the 1950s, prior to the development of nuclear magnetic resonance spectroscopy, he determined the structure of several diterpene alkaloids including veatchine, atisine, annotinine, delphinine, aconitine, and songorine. After returning to New Brunswick from Ayerst in 1964, he began a successful program to synthesize these compounds, culminating in the total synthesis of chasmanine and napelline. Towards the end of the 1970s Wiesner turned his attention to digitalis derivatives, with the goal of finding cardiac glycosides with safer therapeutic ratios. In the last decade of his career he succeeded in demonstrating the separation of the inotropic and toxic properties of this group of compounds, elucidated the underlying chemical mechanism, and finally achieved the total synthesis of digitoxin and other cardioactive steroids.

== Honors and awards ==
Wiesner received a Guggenheim Fellowship in 1952, the Chemical Institute of Canada's Palladium Medal in 1963, the Royal Society of Chemistry's Centenary Prize in 1976, the American Chemical Society's Ernest Guenther Award in 1983, and the Izaak Walton Killam Memorial Prize in 1986. He was elected to the Royal Society of Canada in 1957, to the Royal Society in 1969, and admitted to the Pontifical Academy of Sciences in 1978. He was awarded the Order of Canada on June 25, 1975. He also received the Marin Drinov Medal of the Bulgarian Academy of Sciences.
