= Carl Mannich =

German chemist (1877–1947)

- Born: 8 March 1877; Breslau, Germany
- Died: 5 March 1947 (aged 69); Karlsruhe, Germany
- Known for: Mannich reaction
- Scientific career
- Fields: Pharmaceutical chemistry, Organic chemistry
- Workplaces: University of Berlin

Carl Ulrich Franz Mannich (8 March 1877 in Breslau – 5 March 1947 in Karlsruhe) was a German chemist. From 1927 to 1943 he was professor for pharmaceutical chemistry at the University of Berlin. His areas of expertise were keto bases, alcohol bases, derivatives of piperidine, papaverine, lactones and also Digitalis-glycosides.

The Mannich reaction was named after his discovery of the mechanism in 1912.

== Biography ==
=== Life ===
Mannich attended high school in Weimar and later on in Berlin where he left before graduating, taking an internship at a pharmacy instead. From 1898, he studied in Marburg and Berlin and received his doctorate in 1903 in Basel. In 1905, he completed the matriculation examination for the University of Berlin and passed the state examination for food chemistry. He completed his studies at the University of Berlin in 1910 after which he was appointed as an extraordinary professor. Mannich became an extraordinary professor for Pharmaceutical Chemistry in Göttingen from 1911 to 1917, and went to Frankfurt in 1920. Between 1927 and 1943 Mannich was Professor of Pharmaceutical Chemistry at the University of Berlin. In the years between 1932 and 1934 he was President of the "Deutsche Pharmazeutische Gesellschaft (DPhG)". In the winter semester 1946/1947, he took over the Chair of Pharmaceutical Chemistry at TH Karlsruhe.

=== Scientific life ===
Mannich is well known for his discovery of a special form of amino alkylation which was named after him: the Mannich reaction. Mannich, along with his colleague Willy Jacobsohn, synthesized the psychedelic drug and entactogen 3,4-methylenedioxyamphetamine (MDA) in 1910, though its psychoactive effects were not discovered until much later. In 1912, Mannich was able to describe the first synthetic morphine glucoside. He also completed a series of works in 1917 about the opium alkaloids and gave a method for the production of pure opium extracts. Mannich also developed a method for the determination of morphine content in opium, which allowed for effective dosing without having to use complex physiological individual tests. With his synthesis, he contributed to the determination of the structure of morphine. Mannich advanced the field of applied pharmacy with his development of various testing and detection methods. These include polarimetry of starch in order to detect boric acid in food or the amount of ethanol in alcoholic beverages.

== Scientific works ==
- Über die Bildung von Benzolderivaten aus Dimethylamino-butanon und Malon-ester bzw. Acetessigester. Berichte der deutschen chemischen Gesellschaft (1938, A and B Series), vol. 71 (10), p. 2090-2092.
- Eine Synthese des Arecaidinaldehyds und des Arecolins Berichte der deutschen chemischen Gesellschaft (1942, A and B Series), vol. 75 (12) p. 1480-1483.
- Über g-Strophanthin (Ouabain) und g-Strophanthidin Berichte der deutschen chemischen Gesellschaft (1942, A and B Series), vol. 75 (12), p. 737-750.
- Synthese und Umsetzungen von 1.3-Ketobasen mit sekundärem Stickstoff Berichte der deutschen chemischen Gesellschaft (1942, A and B Series), vol. 75 (1), p. 49-64.
