= Brian Evans Conway =

Canadian electrochemist (1927–2005)

Brian Evans Conway (January 26, 1927 – July 9, 2005), professor emeritus in the Department of Chemistry at the University of Ottawa, was a world-renowned electrochemist, and had a long and distinguished career at the University of Ottawa that spanned five decades.

Conway was born at Farnborough, UK. Prior to his arrival in Canada, he obtained his Ph.D. from Imperial College in 1949 under the supervision of John Bockris. He subsequently worked as a research associate at the Chester Beatty Cancer Research Institute in London. From 1954 until 1956 he was assistant professor at University of Pennsylvania.

In 1956, he was recruited to the then two-year-old Department of Chemistry at the University of Ottawa as an associate professor by the late Professor Keith J. Laidler. He was promoted to the rank of full professor in 1962.

Conway served as chairman of the department from 1966 to 1969 and from 1975 to 1980. He was a Killam Senior Research Fellow from 1983 to 1985 and the Natural Sciences and Engineering Research Council (NSERC) - Alcan Professor of Electrochemistry from 1987 to 1992.

He is the author of more than 400 refereed scientific research articles and four books. is a senior editor of 2 series, Comprehensive Treatise of Electrochemistry and Modern Aspects of Electrochemistry, and has written Electrochemical Data, Electrode Processes and Ionic Hydration in Chemistry and Biophysics.

Conway was a "complete" electrochemist in that he worked on nearly all aspects of electrochemistry: the electrified interface, ion solvation, adsorption, electrode kinetics and solvated electron, oxide film formation, electrocatalysis, rechargeable batteries, and electrochemical capacitors. He coined the term Supercapacitor.

Amongst his most prestigious honours and awards are Fellow of the Royal Society of Canada (1968), the Chemical Institute of Canada Medal (1975), the American Chemical Society Kendall Award in Surface Chemistry (1984), the Electrochemical Society Henry Linford Medal (1984), the Olin Palladium Medal and Award of the Electrochemical Society (1989), the Galvani Medal of the Italian Chemical Society (1991), and Fellow of the Electrochemical Society (1995).
