= Pseudaconitine =

Names
- IUPAC name 8-(Acetyloxy)-20-ethyl-3,13-dihydroxy-1α,6α,16β-trimethoxy-4-(methoxymethyl)aconitan-14α-yl 3,4-dimethoxybenzoate
- Other names Nepaline; Acraconitine; Feraconitine; Pseudoaconitine; Nepal aconitine; Nepaline; Veratroylaconine

Identifiers
CAS Number	127-29-7
3D model (JSmol)	Interactive image
ChEMBL	ChEMBL509646
ChemSpider	390354
PubChem CID	3035296
UNII	5483BY72RT
CompTox Dashboard (EPA)	DTXSID90894011
- InChI: InChI=1S/C36H51NO12/c1-9-37-16-33(17-42-3)23(39)13-24(45-6)36-20-14-34(41)25(46-7)15-35(49-18(2)38,27(30(36)37)28(47-8)29(33)36)26(20)31(34)48-32(40)19-10-11-21(43-4)22(12-19)44-5/h10-12,20,23-31,39,41H,9,13-17H2,1-8H3/t20-,23-,24+,25+,26-,27+,28+,29-,30?,31-,33+,34+,35-,36+/m1/s1 Key: YVPYMQHYESYLIR-CERQHTHQSA-N; InChI=1/C36H51NO12/c1-9-37-16-33(17-42-3)23(39)13-24(45-6)36-20-14-34(41)25(46-7)15-35(49-18(2)38,27(30(36)37)28(47-8)29(33)36)26(20)31(34)48-32(40)19-10-11-21(43-4)22(12-19)44-5/h10-12,20,23-31,39,41H,9,13-17H2,1-8H3/t20-,23-,24+,25+,26-,27+,28+,29-,30?,31-,33+,34+,35-,36+/m1/s1 Key: YVPYMQHYESYLIR-CERQHTHQBX
- SMILES: O=C(O[C@H]5[C@]3(O)C[C@H]4[C@@]16C2N(CC)C[C@]([C@H]1[C@@H](OC)[C@@H]2[C@@](OC(=O)C)(C[C@@H]3OC)[C@H]45)(COC)[C@H](O)C[C@@H]6OC)c7ccc(OC)c(OC)c7

Properties
Chemical formula	C_{36}H_{51}NO_{12}
Molar mass	689.799 g·mol^{−1}
Melting point	202 °C (396 °F; 475 K)
- Except where otherwise noted, data are given for materials in their standard state (at 25 °C [77 °F], 100 kPa). verify (what is ?) Infobox references

Pseudaconitine, also known as nepaline (C_{36}H_{51}NO_{12}), is an extremely toxic alkaloid found in high quantities in the roots of Aconitum ferox, also known as Indian Monkshood, which belongs to the family Ranunculaceae. The plant is found in East Asia, including the Himalayas.

== History ==
Pseudaconitine was discovered in 1878 by Wright and Luff. They isolated a highly toxic alkaloid from the roots of the plant Aconitum ferox and called it pseudaconitine. The poison is also called bikh, bish, or nabee.

== Toxicity and mechanism ==
Pseudaconitine is a moderate inhibitor of the enzyme acetylcholinesterase. This enzyme breaks down the neurotransmitter acetylcholine through hydrolysis. Inhibition of this enzyme causes a constant stimulation of the postsynaptic membrane by the neurotransmitter which it cannot cancel. This accumulation of acetylcholine may thus lead to the constant stimulation of the muscles, glands and central nervous system. Furthermore, it appears the substance in small quantities also causes a tingling effect on the tongue, lips and skin.

== Structure and reactivity ==
Pseudaconitine is a diterpene alkaloid, with the chemical formula C_{36}H_{51}NO_{12}. The crystal melts at 202 °C and is moderately soluble in water, but more so in alcohol. This shows that it is a lipophilic substance. When heated in the dry state, it undergoes pyrolysis and pyropseudaconitine (C_{34}H_{47}O_{10}N) is formed. This does not have the same tingling effect as pseudaconitine.

== See also ==
- Aconitine
