= Hubert Girault =

Swiss scientist, specialist in physical and analytical electrochemistry

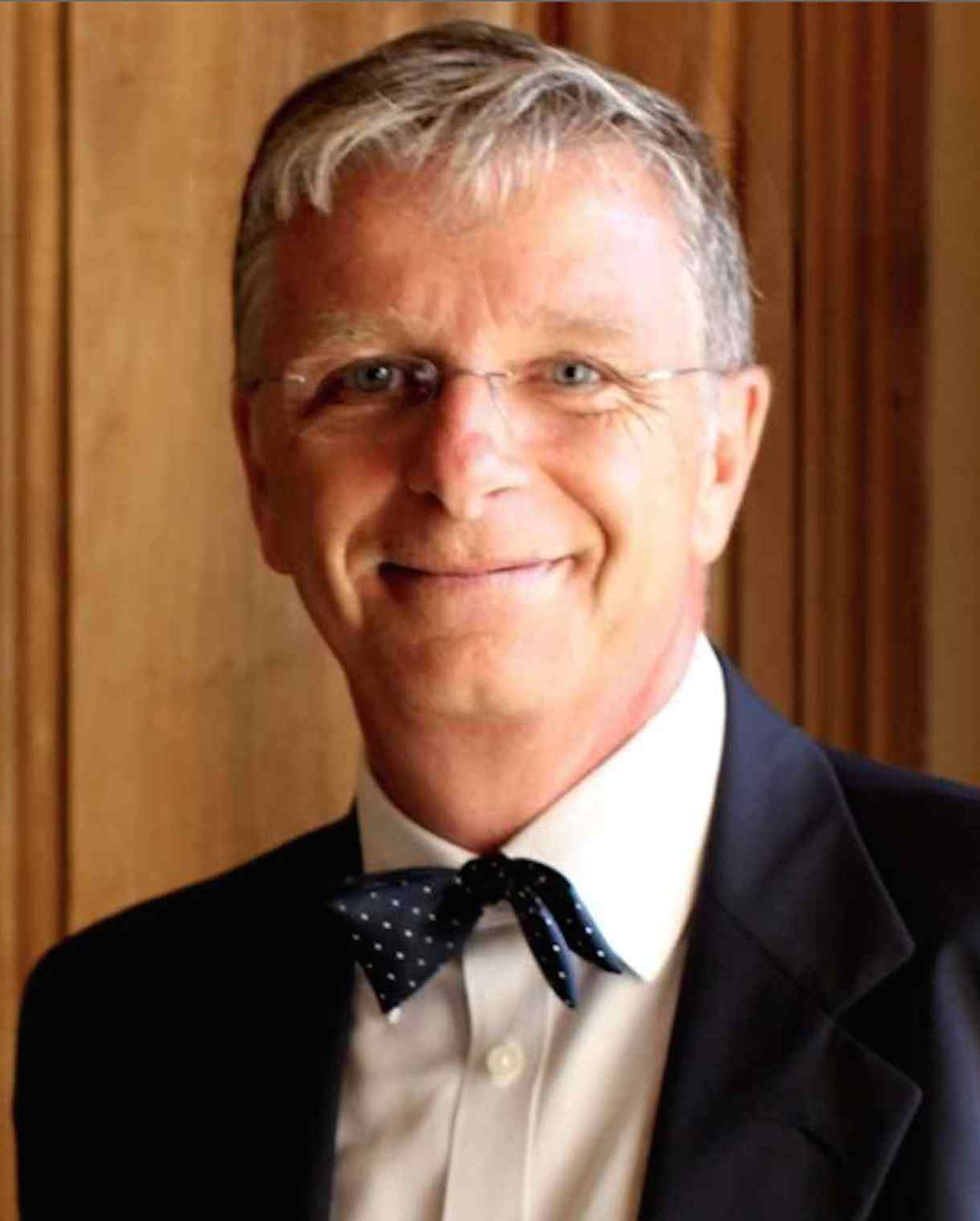
- Born: 13 February 1957 (age 69); Saint-Maur-des Fossés, France
- Education: University of Southampton
- Known for: Electrochemistry
- Awards: Faraday Medal of the Royal Society of Chemistry (2006); Fellow of the International Society of Electrochemistry (2007); Fellow of the Royal Society of Chemistry (2009); Reilley Award of the Society for Electroanalytical Chemistry (2015); Fellow of the Electrochemical Society USA (2019); Shikata Medal, Polarographic Society of Japan (2020); Doctor Honoris Causa Aalto University (2023); Electrochimica Acta Gold medal International Society of Electrochemistry (2024)
- Scientific career
- Fields: Electrochemistry, physical chemistry, analytical chemistry
- Workplaces: École Polytechnique Fédérale de Lausanne
- Website: www.h2valsmart.com

Hubert Girault (born 13 February 1957 in Saint-Maur-des-Fossés, France) is a Swiss chemist and is Emeritus Professor at the École Polytechnique Fédérale de Lausanne (1992-2022). He was the director of the Laboratoire d'Electrochimie Physique et Analytique, with expertise in electrochemistry at soft interfaces, Lab-on-a-Chip techniques, bio-analytical chemistry and mass-spectrometry, and electrochemical energy systems.

Professor Girault has authored more than 600 scientific publications, with more the 20,000 citations. He has authored a textbook entitled "Electrochimie: Physique et Analytique", which is published in English as "Analytical and Physical Electrochemistry". Professor Girault is an inventor of more than 20 patents (including developing of ESTASI method of ionisation). He has served as a visiting professor at ENS Cachan (Paris, France), Fudan University (China), Kyoto University (Japan), Peking University (China), Xiamen University (China). Polytechnique University Mohamed VI (UM6P, Morocco).

He has been married to Jördis since 1984 and is the father of Jan-Torben born 1988 and Freya-Merret born 1990.

== Early life ==
Hubert Girault was born in France in 1957 and spent his childhood in Sucy-en-Brie before moving to Barbizon near Fontainebleau.

== Academic career ==
Hubert Girault earned his engineering diploma in electrochemistry from the Grenoble Institute of Technology in 1979. Three years after that, in 1982, he completed his PhD thesis, entitled "Interfacial studies using drop image-processing techniques", at the University of Southampton, England. From 1982 to 1985, he worked as a post-doctoral researcher at the University of Southampton, before becoming a lecturer in physical chemistry at the University of Edinburgh. In 1992, he became a professor of physical chemistry at the École Polytechnique Fédérale de Lausanne (EPFL) till 2022. He is also the founder and director of the Laboratoire d'Electrochimie Physique et Analytique. He has served twice as chairman of the Department of Chemistry, now called Institute of Chemical and Engineering Science (ISIC) for the periods 1995-1997 and 2004–2008. He has also served twice as head of the Chemistry Teaching Commission in charge of chemistry and chemical engineering education at EPFL, now called Section of Chemistry and Chemical Engineering for the period 1997–1999 and 2001–2004.

He was director of the Doctoral Program in Chemistry at EPFL for the period 1999–2000. During the period 2011–2014, he was Dean of Bachelor & Master Studies at EPFL and has supervised a comprehensive teaching reform, with the definition of new curricula starting September 2013.

During his career, he has supervised 70 PhD students and trained many postdoctoral fellows. 30 former PhDs and post-docs are now professors in Canada, China, Denmark, Finland, France, Germany, Ireland, Italy, Japan, Korea, Singapore, UK & USA. Education has been a major part of his activities, and his lecture notes have formed the basis of a textbook entitled: "Electrochimie Physique et Analytique" (now in the third edition); translated in English "Analytical and Physical Electrochemistry".

Prof. Hubert Girault always had an interest in scientific publishing. Between, 1996 and 2001, he was associate editor of Journal of Electroanalytical Chemistry, which at the time was one of the major reference journals in the field. He is also the vice-president of the Presses polytechniques et universitaires romandes. He has served on many editorial boards and has served as associate editor of Chemical Science (Royal Society of Chemistry) (2010-2018). Prof. Hubert Girault was Chairman of the Electrochemistry division at EUCHEMS (2008-2010), and was the Chairman of the annual meeting of the International Society of Electrochemistry, Lausanne 2014.

== Commercial enterprises ==
Girault has been the founding co-director of five companies:

- Dydropp (1982, dissolved 1986) active in the production of video digitizing units for surface tension measurements,
- Ecosse Sensors (1990, now part of Inverness Medical Technologies, USA) active in the production of laser photo-ablated carbon electrodes for heavy metal detection,
- DiagnoSwiss (1999-2012) active in the production of fast immunoassay systems.
- SENSaSION (2017-2021) active in the field of bacteria detection and antibiotic susceptibility test (AST).
- H2ValSmart, active in scientific consulting.

== Recognition ==
In 2006, he was awarded the Faraday Medal by the Royal Society of Chemistry. The following year, he was named a Fellow of the International Society of Electrochemistry. He was subsequently named a Fellow of the Royal Society of Chemistry in 2009 and Fellow of the Electrochemical Society in 2019. He received the Visiting Professorship Award for the "111 Project" from the Chinese Ministry of Education from 2008 to 2011. In 2015, he was awarded the Reilley Award by the American Society of Electroanalytical Chemistry. In 2020, he received the Shikata International Medal of the Polarographic Society of Japan. In 2023, he received a Doctor Honoris Causa from Aalto University. In 2024, he was awarded the Electrochimica Acta Gold medal from the International Society of Electrochemistry .
