= Mannich base =

A Mannich base is a beta-amino-ketone, which is formed in the reaction of an amine, formaldehyde (or an aldehyde) and a carbon acid. The Mannich base is an endproduct in the Mannich reaction, which is nucleophilic addition reaction of a non-enolizable aldehyde and any primary or secondary amine to produce resonance stabilized imine (iminium ion or imine salt). The addition of a carbanion from a CH acidic compound (any enolizable carbonyl compound, amide, carbamate, hydantoin or urea) to the imine gives the Mannich base.

== Reactivity ==
With primary or secondary amines, Mannich bases react with additional aldehyde and carbon acid to larger adducts HN(CH_{2}CH_{2}COR)_{2} and N(CH_{2}CH_{2}COR)_{3}. With multiple acidic hydrogen atoms on the carbon acid higher adducts are also possible. Ammonia can be split off in an elimination reaction to form enals and enones.
