= Solid-phase microextraction =

Laboratory technique

Solid-phase microextraction sampling

Solid phase microextraction, or SPME, is a solid-phase extraction sampling technique that involves the use of a fiber coated with an extracting phase, that can be a liquid (polymer) or a solid (sorbent), which extracts different kinds of analytes (including both volatile and non-volatile) from different kinds of media, that can be in liquid or gas phase. The quantity of analyte extracted by the fibre is proportional to its concentration in the sample as long as equilibrium is reached or, in case of short time pre-equilibrium, with help of convection or agitation.

== Analysis ==
After extraction, the SPME fiber is transferred to the injection port of separating instruments, such as a gas chromatography and mass spectrometry, where desorption of the analyte takes place and analysis is carried out.

== Advantages ==
The attraction of SPME is that the extraction is fast, simple, can be done usually without solvents, and detection limits can reach parts per trillion (ppt) levels for certain compounds. SPME also has great potential for field applications; on-site sampling can be done even by nonscientists without the need to have gas chromatography-mass spectrometry equipment at each location. When properly stored, samples can be analyzed days later in the laboratory without significant loss of volatiles.

== Fiber coatings ==
The coating on the SPME fiber can be selected to improve sensitivity for specific analytes of interest; ideally the sorbent layer will have a high affinity for the target analytes. There are many commercially available SPME fiber coatings that are combinations of polydimethylsiloxane, divinylbenzene, Carboxen, polyacrylate, and polyethylene glycol. However, one downside to many of the commercially available SPME fibers is that they tend to be physically brittle due to their composition. Depending on the characteristics of the target analytes, certain properties of the coating improve extraction such as polarity, thickness, and surface area. The sample matrix can also influence the fiber coating selection. Based on the sample and analytes of interest, the fiber may need to tolerate direct immersion as opposed to a headspace extraction. In one of the study the fiber coating method significantly enhances the performance of SPME by ensuring a high binding capacity and improved mass transfer efficiency. By preventing the ingress of the polymeric adhesive matrix into the pores of the sorbent particles, the method allows for faster adsorption and desorption times, which is crucial for high-throughput applications.

Metal–organic frameworks (MOFs) have been investigated as sorbent materials for SPME coatings because their pore dimensions and surface functional groups can be modified to alter extraction affinity and selectivity. Zirconium-based MOFs, including members of the UiO family, have been incorporated into polymeric coatings on SPME Arrow devices for the extraction of phenolic contaminants from food samples. For example, an amino-functionalized UiO-67 material was dispersed in polyacrylonitrile and deposited on a stainless-steel SPME Arrow by electrospinning. The coating was used with high-performance liquid chromatography and ultraviolet detection to determine bisphenol A, p-tert-butylphenol, 4-pentylphenol, nonylphenol, and hexestrol in milk and pork. The reported limits of detection were 0.003–0.01 μg L^{−1}, and the coating retained stable extraction performance over 200 extraction–desorption cycles.

== Application of SPME in forensic science ==
SPME has become an essential technique in forensic science, particularly for analyzing complex matrices such as blood, urine, and environmental samples. Its advantages include the ability to perform rapid and sensitive extractions without the need for extensive sample preparation, which is crucial in forensic investigations where sample integrity is paramount. For instance, SPME has been successfully employed to detect drugs of abuse, explosives, and other volatile compounds from various samples, allowing for the efficient identification of substances relevant to criminal cases. The automation and miniaturization of SPME techniques further enhance their applicability in forensic settings, enabling high-throughput analysis and reducing the risk of contamination.

== Green sample preparation ==
SPME is recognized as a green analytical method for sample preparation, particularly in forensic drug analysis. This technique offers several advantages over traditional methods like liquid–liquid extraction (LLE) and solid-phase extraction (SPE), including automation, rapid sample processing, and reduced solvent usage. SPME allows for the extraction of analytes directly from complex matrices, such as biological and environmental samples, while minimizing the environmental impact associated with conventional extraction techniques.

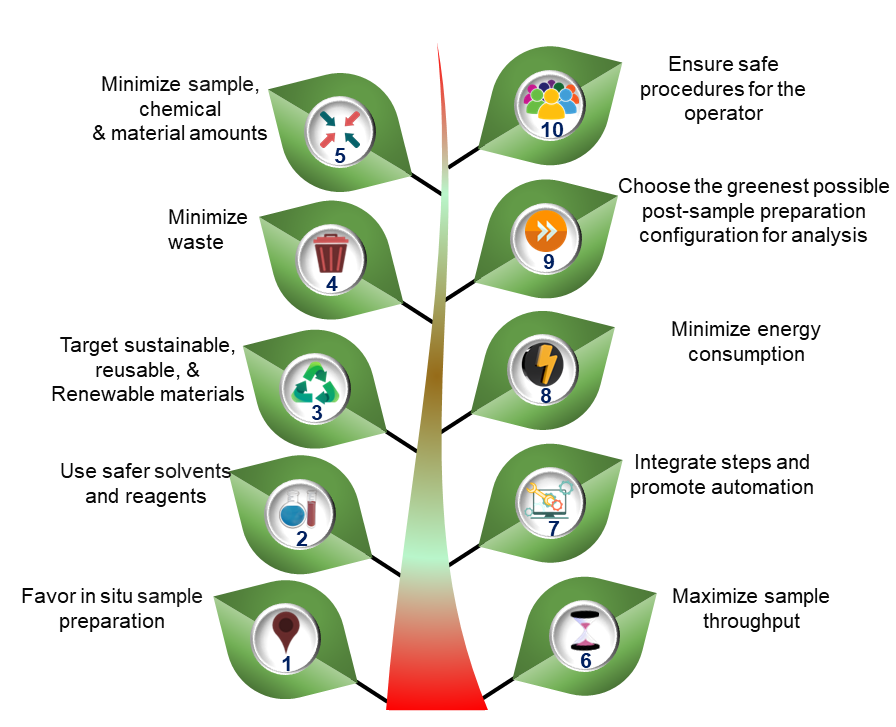
Ten principles of green sample preparation.

== Interactive lectures ==
- Introduction to Solid Phase Microextraction
- Quantification using Solid Phase Microextraction
