= Otto Maass =

Canadian scientist

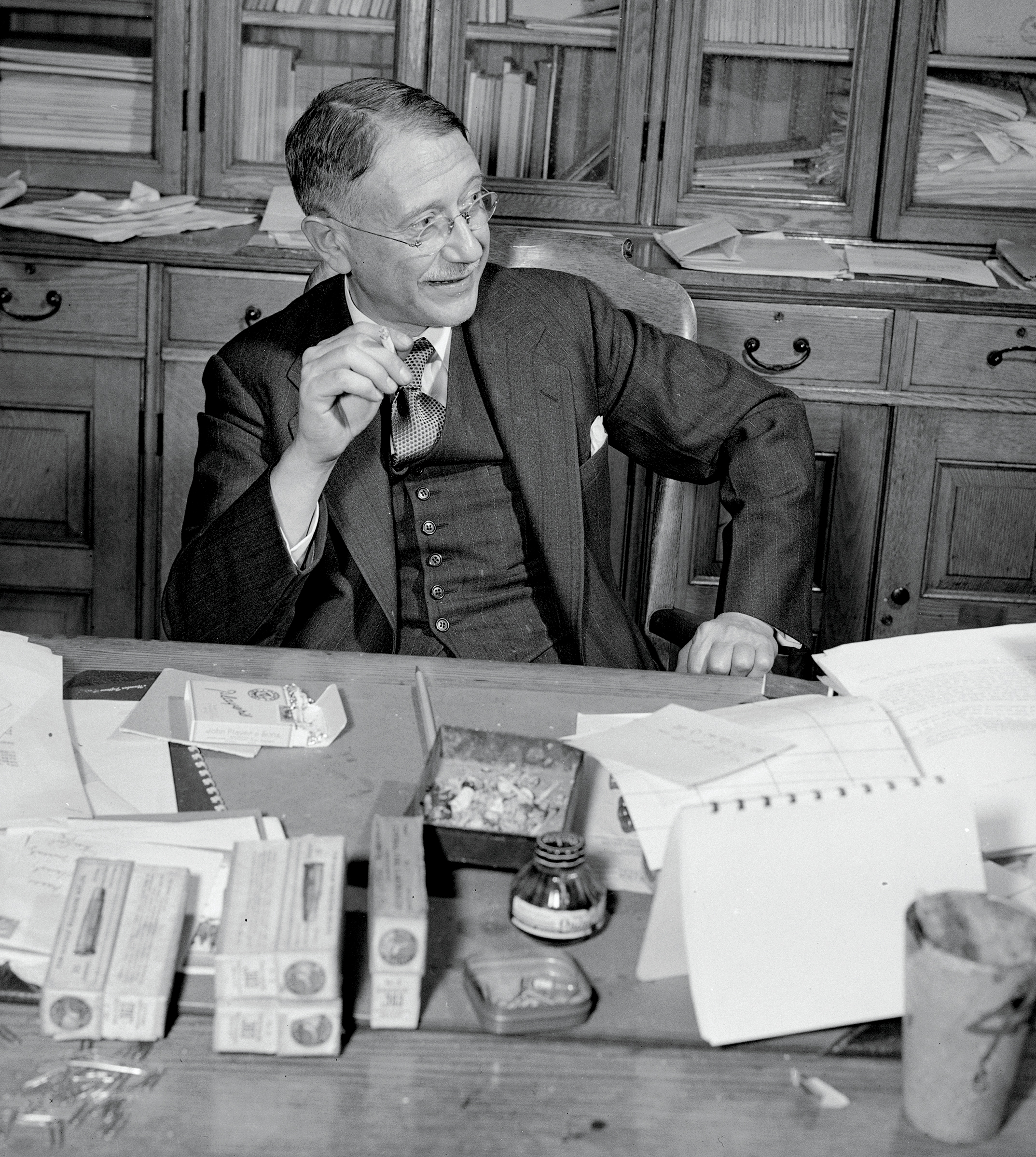
- Born: 8 July 1890; New York City, New York
- Died: 3 July 1961 (aged 70); Montreal, Quebec
- Education: McGill University (B.A., M.Sc.); Harvard University (Ph.D.)
- Awards: Henry Marshall Tory Medal (1945); Fellow of the Royal Society
- Scientific career
- Fields: Chemistry
- Workplaces: McGill University

Otto Maass, CBE FRS FRSC (8 July 1890 – 3 July 1961) was a Canadian academic and scientist.

== Education ==
Born in New York City, New York, Maass started teaching at McGill University in 1923 retiring in 1955. He was the Macdonald Professor of Chemistry and was chairman of the department of chemistry from 1937 to 1955.

== Career ==
His scientific research in physical chemistry included contributions in calorimetry, critical-state phenomena, preparation and properties of pure hydrogen peroxide, properties of cellulose, and the chemical pulping of wood.

In 1940, he was made a Fellow of the Royal Society. In 1946, he was made a Commander of the Order of the British Empire. In 1947, he was named the director of the newly created DRB biological and chemical warfare research division. A Fellow of the Royal Society of Canada, he was awarded the Society's Henry Marshall Tory Medal in 1945. McGill University's Otto Maass Chemistry Building, built between 1964 and 1966, is named in his honour. To this day there remains a plaque on the building dedicating it to Maass's excellent contributions to "science in defense of his country", widely interpreted as a euphemistic nod to his work on Fuel Air Explosives.
