= List of the vascular plants in the Red Data Book of Russia =

This is a complete and as of 2009 up-to-date list of vascular plants listed in the Red Data Book of the Russian Federation and protected in Russia at the federal level.

== Pteridophyta ==
=== Aspleniaceae ===
Asplenium adiantum-nigrum L. - (rare)
Asplenium daghestanicum Christ - (rare)
Asplenium altajense (Kom.) Grub. - (rare)
Asplenium sajanense Gudoschn. et Krasnob. - (declining)
Asplenium nesii Christ. - (rare)

=== Athyriaceae ===
Athyriopsis japonica (Thunb.) Ching. - (endangered)
Athyrium wardii (Hook.) Makino. - (rare)
Lunathyrium henryi (Baker) Kurata - (rare)

=== Botrychiaceae ===
Botrychium simplex E. Hitchc. - (endangered)

=== Dryopteridaceae ===
Arachniodes mutica (Franch. et Savat.) Ohwi. - (declining)
Dryopteris chinensis (Baker) Koidz. - (endangered)
Leptorumohra miqueliana (Maxim. ex Franch. et Savat.) H. Ito - (endangered)

=== Hymenophyllaceae ===
Mecodium wrightii (Bsch) Copel. - (declining)

=== Marsileaceae ===
Marsilea aegyptica Willd. - (endangered)
Marsilea strigosa Willd. - (endangered)

=== Ophioglossaceae ===
Ophioglossum alascanum E. Britt. - (declining)
Ophioglossum thermale Kom. - (declining)

=== Osmundaceae ===
Osmunda japonica Thunb. - (rare)
Osmundastrum claytonianum L. Tagawa - (declining)

=== Plagiogyriaceae ===
Plagiogyria mutsumurana (Makino) Makino - (rare)

=== Polypodiaceae ===
Pyrrosia petiolosa (Christ et Baroni) Ching - (rare)

=== Sinopteridaceae ===
Cheilanthes kuhnii Milde - (rare)

=== Woodsiaceae ===
Woodsia fragilis (Trev.) Moore - (rare)

== Lycopodiophyta ==
=== Isoetaceae ===
Isoetes lacustris L. - (rare)
Isoetes maritima Underw. - (declining)
Isoetes setacea Durieu - (declining)

== Pinophyta ==
=== Cupressaceae ===
Juniperus conferta Parl. - (rare)
Juniperus excelsa Bieb. - (declining)
Juniperus foetidissima Willd. - (declining)
Juniperus rigida Siebold et Zucc. subsp. litoralis Urussov - (declining)
Juniperus sargentii (A. Henry) Takeda ex Koidz. - (rare)
Microbiota decussata Kom. - (declining)

=== Pinaceae ===
Larix olgensis A. Henry - (declining)
Picea glehnii (Fr. Schmidt) Mast. - (rare)
Pinus densiflora Siebold et Zucc. - (declining)
Pinus pallasiana D. Don. - (endangered)
Pinus pityusa Stev. - (declining)
Pinus sylvestris L. var. cretacea Kalenicz. ex Kom. - (rare)

=== Taxaceae ===
Taxus baccata L. - (declining)
Taxus cuspidata Siebold et Zucc. ex Endl. - (rare)

== Magnoliophyta ==
=== Aceraceae ===
Acer japonicum Thunb. - (endangered)

=== Adoxaceae ===
Viburnum wrightii Miq. - (rare)

=== Alismataceae ===
Alisma wahlenbergii (Holmb.) Juz. - (endangered)
Caldesia parnassifolia (L.) Parl. - (endangered)

=== Alliaceae ===
Allium bellulum Prokh. - (rare)
Allium grande Lipsky - (declining)
Allium gunibicum Miscz. ex Grossh. - (rare)
Allium neriniflorum (Herb.) Backer - (declining)
Allium paradoxum (Bieb.) G. Don fil. - (rare)
Allium pumilum Vved. - (rare)
Allium regelianum A. Beck. - (declining)
Nectaroscordum tripedale (Trautv.) Grossh. - (endangered)

=== Amaryllidaceae ===
Galanthus angustifolius G. Koss - (declining)
Galanthus bortkewitschianus G. Koss - (endangered)
Galanthus caucasicus (Baker) Grossh. - (rare)
Galanthus lagodechianus Kem. - Nath. - (rare)
Galanthus platyphyllus Traub et Moldenke - (rare)
Galanthus plicatus Bieb. - (declining)
Galanthus woronowii Losinsk. - (declining)
Leucojum aestivum L. - (declining)
Pancratium maritimum L. - (endangered)
Sternbergia colchiciflora Waldst. et Kit. - (endangered)

=== Anacardiaceae ===
Pistacia mutica Fisch. et C.A. Mey. - (rare)

=== Apiaceae ===
Aegopodium latifolium Turcz. - (rare)
Arafoe aromatica M.Pimenov et Lavrova - (rare)
Bupleurum martjanovii Krylov - (rare)
Bupleurum rischawii Albov - (rare)
Cervaria aegopodioides (Boiss.) M.Pimenov - (rare)
Conioselinum smithii (H.Wolff) M.Pimenov et Kljuykov - (rare)
Crithmum maritimum L. - (rare)
Eriosynaphe longifolia (Fisch. ex Spreng.) DC. - (declining)
Eryngium maritimum L. - (declining)
Halosciastrum melanotilingia (Boissieu) M.Pimenov et V.N. Tikhom. - (declining)
Hydrocotyle ramiflora Maxim. - (rare)
Laserpitium stevenii Fisch. et Trautv. - (rare)
Magadania olaensis (Gorovoi et N. S. Pavlova) M.Pimenov et Lavrova - (rare)
Mandenovia komarovii (Manden.) Alava - (declining)
Prangos trifida (Mill.) Herrnst. et Heyn - (probably extinct)
Rupiphila tachiroei (Franch. et Savat.) M.Pimenov et Lavrova - (declining)
Tamamschjanella rubella (E. Busch) M.Pimenov et Kljuykov - (rare)

=== Aquifoliaceae ===
Ilex sugerokii Maxim. - (rare)

=== Araliaceae ===
Aralia continentalis Kitag. - (declining)
Aralia cordata Thunb. - (declining)
Hedera pastuchovii Woronow - (declining)
Kalopanax septemlobus (Thunb.) Koidz. - (rare)
Oplopanax elatus (Nakai) Nakai - (declining)
Panax ginseng C. A. Mey. - (endangered)

=== Aristolochiaceae ===
Aristolochia manshuriensis Kom. - (endangered)

=== Asparagaceae ===
Asparagus brachyphyllus Turcz. - (rare)

=== Asphodelaceae ===
Asphodeline taurica (Pall. ex Bieb.) Endl. - (rare)
Asphodeline tenuior (Bieb.) Ledeb. - (declining)
Eremurus spectabilis Bieb. - (declining)

=== Asteraceae ===
Amphoricarpos elegans Albov - (probably extinct)
Anthemis trotzkiana Claus - (rare)
Arnica alpina (L.) Olin - (declining)
Artemisia hololeuca Bieb. ex Bess. - (declining)
Artemisia limosa Koidz. - (rare)
Artemisia salsoloides Willd. - (rare)
Artemisia senjavinensis Bess. - (rare)
Brachanthemum baranovii (Krasch. et Poljak.) Krasch. - (endangered)
Cancrinia krasnoborovii V. Khan - (rare)
Cladochaeta candidissima (Bieb.) DC. - (rare)
Dendranthema sinuatum (Ledeb.) Tzvelev - (declining)
Erigeron compositus Pursh - (rare)
Jurinea cretacea Bunge - (rare)
Rhaponticum carthamoides (Willd.) Iljin – (rare, except for the populations in Tuva, Altai Republic, Altai Krai, Krasnoyarsk Krai)
Saussurea ceterachifolia Lipsch. - (rare)
Saussurea dorogostaiskii Palib. - (declining)
Saussurea jadrinzevii Krylov - (endangered)
Saussurea sovietica Kom. - (rare)
Saussurea uralensis Lipsch. - (rare)
Serratula tanaitica P. Smirn. - (endangered)
Tanacetum akinfiewii (Alexeenko) Tzvelev - (endangered)
Taraxacum leucoglossum Brenn. - (endangered)
Tridactylina kirilowii (Turcz.) Sch. Bip. - (rare)

=== Berberidaceae ===
Diphylleia grayi Fr. Schmidt - (rare)
Epimedium colchicum (Boiss.) Trautv. - (rare)
Epimedium koreanum Nakai - (endangered)
Epimedium macrosepalum Stearn - (rare)

=== Betulaceae ===
Betula maximowicziana Regel - (endangered)
Betula raddeana Trautv. - (rare)
Betula schmidtii Regel - (rare)
Corylus colurna L. - (declining)
Ostrya carpinifolia Scop. - (declining)

=== Boraginaceae ===
Eritrichium uralense Serg. - (declining)
Mertensia serrulata (Turcz.) DC. - (rare)
Myosotis czekanowskii (Trautv.) Kamelin et V.N.Tikhom. - (declining)
Onosma polyphylla Ledeb. - (rare)

=== Brassicaceae ===
Alyssum sergievskajae Krasnob. - (declining)
Borodinia macrophylla (Turcz.) German - (rare)
Cardamine purpurea Cham. et Schlecht. - (rare)
Cardamine sphenophylla Jurtzev - (rare)
Cochlearia danica L. - (declining)
Crambe cordifolia Stev. - (endangered)
Crambe koktebelica (Junge) N. Busch - (declining)
Crambe steveniana Rupr. - (rare)
Dentaria sibirica (O.E. Schulz) N. Busch - (rare)
Didymophysa aucheri Boiss. - (rare)
Erucastrum cretaceum Kotov - (rare)
Eutrema cordifolium Turcz. ex Ledeb. - (declining)
Galitzkya spathulata (Steph.) V. Botschantz. - (declining)
Lepidium meyeri Claus - (declining)
Macropodium pterospermum Fr. Schmidt - (rare)
Matthiola fragrans Bunge - (rare)
Megadenia pygmaea Maxim. - (rare)
Pseudovesicaria digitata (C.A. Mey.) Rupr. - (rare)
Redowskia sophiifolia Cham. et Schlecht. - (endangered)
Smelowskia inopinata (Kom.) Kom. - (rare)

=== Buxaceae ===
Buxus colchica Pojark. - (declining)

=== Cabombaceae ===
Brasenia schreberi J. F. Gmel. - (endangered)

=== Campanulaceae ===
Adenophora jacutica Fed. - (rare)
Campanula ardonensis Rupr. - (declining)
Campanula autraniana Albov - (declining)
Campanula besenginica Fomin - (rare)
Campanula dolomitica E. Busch - (rare)
Campanula komarovii Maleev - (rare)
Campanula kryophila Rupr. - (rare)
Campanula ossetica Bieb. - (declining)
Edraianthus owerinianus Rupr. - (endangered)

=== Capparaceae ===
Cleome donetzica Tzvelev - (rare)

=== Caprifoliaceae ===
Lonicera etrusca Santi - (rare)
Lonicera tolmatchevii Pojark. - (declining)

=== Caryophyllaceae ===
Dianthus acantholimonoides Schischk. - (rare)
Gastrolychnis soczaviana (Schischk.) Tolm. et Kozhanch. - (rare)
Gypsophila uralensis Less. subsp. inegensis (Perf.) Kamelin - (rare)
Stellaria martjanovii Krylov - (rare)
Minuartia krascheninnikovii Schischk. - (rare)
Paronychia cephalotes (Bieb.) Bess. - (declining)
Silene akinfievii Schmalh. - (rare)
Silene cretacea Fisch. ex Spreng. - (rare)
Silene hellmannii Claus - (rare)
Silene rupestris L. - (declining)

=== Celastraceae ===
Euonymus nana Bieb. - (endangered)

зЫКд

=== Chenopodiaceae ===
Krascheninnikovia lenensis (Kumin.) Tzvelev - (rare)

=== Chloranthaceae ===
Chloranthus serratus (Tunb.) Roem. et Schult. - (endangered)

=== Cistaceae ===
Helianthemum arcticum (Grosser) Janch. - (endangered)

=== Convolvulaceae ===
Calystegia soldanella (L.) R. Br. - (rare)

=== Cornaceae ===
Bothrocaryum controversum (Hemsl. ex Prain) Pojarkov - (rare)

=== Crassulaceae ===
Orostachys paradoxa (A.P.Khokhr. et Worosch.) Czer. - (endangered)
Rhodiola rosea L. – (rare, except for the populations in Altai Krai, Krasnoyarsk Krai, Tyva and Magadan Oblast)
Sedum corymbosum Grossh. - (endangered)
Tillea aquatica L. - (rare)

=== Cyperaceae ===
Crex davalliana Smith - (endangered)
Carex erythrobasis Levl. et Vaniot - (rare)
Carex incisa Boott - (rare)
Carex insaniae Koidz. - (rare)
Carex japonica Thunb. - (rare)
Carex umbrosa Host - (rare)
Cladium mariscus (L.) Pohl - (declining)
Fimbristylis ochotensis (Meinsh.) Kom. - (declining)
Rhynchospora faberi Clarke - (rare)
Rhynchospora fusca (L.) Ait. fil. - (rare)

=== Daphniphyllaceae ===
Daphniphyllum humile Maxim. ex Franch. et Savat. - (declining)

=== Dioscoreaceae ===
Dioscorea caucasica Lipsky - (endangered)
Dioscorea nipponica Makino - (declining, except for the populations in Primorsky Krai)

=== Dipsacaceae ===
Cephalaria litvinovii Bobr. - (declining)
Scabiosa olgae Albov - (rare)

=== Droseraceae ===
Aldrovanda vesiculosa L. - (rare)

=== Ebenaceae ===
Diospyros lotus L. - (rare)

=== Ericaceae ===
Rhododendron fauriei Franch. - (rare)
Rhododendron schlippenbachii Maxim. - (declining)
Rhododendron tschonoskii Maxim. - (rare)

=== Eriocaulaceae ===
Eriocaulon komarovii Tzvelev - (endangered)

=== Euphorbiaceae ===
Euphorbia aristata Schmalh. - (declining)
Euphorbia potaninii Proch. - (declining)
Euphorbia rigida Bieb. - (declining)
Euphorbia zhiguliensis Prokh. - (rare)
Leptopus colchicus (Fisch. et C.A. Mey. ex Boiss.) Pojark. - (rare)

=== Fabaceae ===
Anthyllis kuzenevae Juz. - (probably extinct)
Astracantha arnacantha (Bieb.) Podlech - (declining)
Astragalus aksaicus Schischk. - (rare)
Astragalus clerceanus Iljin et Krasch. - (declining)
Astragalus fissuralis Alexeenko - (rare)
Astragalus helmii Fisch. var. permiensis (C.A. Mey.) Korsh. - (rare)
Astragalus igoschinae Kamelin et Jurtzev - (rare)
Astragalus karakugensis Bunge - (rare)
Astragalus kungurensis Boriss. - (endangered)
Astragalus luxurians Bunge - (endangered)
Astragalus olchonensis Gontsch. - (endangered)
Astragalus tanaiticus C. Koch - (declining)
Astragalus zingeri Korsh. - (declining)
Calophaca wolgarica (L. fil.) DC. - (declining)
Cicer minutum Boiss. et Hohen. - (declining)
Desmodium oldhami Oliv. - (declining)
Eremosparton aphyllum (Pall.) Fisch. et C.A. Mey. - (declining)
Ewersmannia subspinosa (Fisch. ex DC.) B. Fedtsch. - (endangered)
Genista albida Willd. - (rare)
Genista humifusa L. - (rare)
Genista suanica Schischk. - (rare)
Genista tanaitica P.A.Smirn. - (rare)
Gueldenstaedtia monophylla Fisch. - (rare)
Hedysarum americanum (Michx.) Britt. - (rare)
Hedysarum candidum Bieb. - (declining)
Hedysarum cretaceum Fisch. - (rare)
Hedysarum daghestanicum Rupr. ex Boiss. - (rare)
Hedysarum grandiflorum Pall. - (rare)
Hedysarum minussinense B.Fedtsch. - (rare)
Hedysarum razoumovianum Fisch. et Helm - (rare)
Hedysarum ucrainicum Kaschm. - (rare)
Hedysarum ussuriense I. Schischk. et Kom. - (declining)
Hedysarum zundukii Peschkova - (declining)
Lathyrus venetus (Mill.) Wohlf. - (rare)
Lespedeza cyrtobotrya Miq. - (rare)
Lespedeza tomentosa (Thunb.) Maxim. - (rare)
Medicago cancellata Bieb. - (rare)
Oxytropis acanthacea Jurtzev - (rare)
Oxytropis alpestris Schischk. - (rare)
Oxytropis dubia Turcz. - (uncertain)
Oxytropis glandulosa Turcz. - (rare)
Oxytropis hippolyti Boriss. - (rare)
Oxytropis includens Basil. - (rare)
Oxytropis lanuginosa Kom. - (rare)
Oxytropis nitens Turcz. - (rare)
Oxytropis nivea Bunge - (rare)
Oxytropis physocarpa Ledeb. - (rare)
Oxytropis sverdrupii Lynge - (rare)
Oxytropis sublongipes Jurtzev - (rare)
Oxytropis todomoshiriensis Miyabe et Miyake - (declining)
Oxytropis trichophysa Bunge - (rare)
Oxytropis triphylla (Pall.) Pers. - (rare)
Oxytropis tschujae Bunge - (rare)
Pueraria lobata (Willd.) Ohwi - (rare)
Vavilovia formosa (Stev.) Fed. - (declining)
Vicia hololasia Woronow - (endangered)
Vicia tsydenii Malyschev - (endangered)

=== Fagaceae ===
Quercus dentata Thunb. - (rare)

=== Fumariaceae ===
Adlumia asiatica Ohwi - (declining)
Corydalis bungeana Turcz. - (rare)
Corydalis tarkiensis Prokh. - (rare)

=== Gentianaceae ===
Gentiana lagodechiana (Kusn.) Grossh. - (rare)
Gentiana paradoxa Albov - (rare)
Gentianella sugawarae (Hara) Czer. - (rare)
Swertia baicalensis M.Popov ex Pissjauk. - (rare)
Swertia perennis L. - (endangered)

=== Geraniaceae ===
Erodium stevenii Bieb. - (rare)
Erodium tataricum Willd. - (rare)
Erodium tibetanum Edgew. - (rare)

=== Globulariaceae ===
Globularia punctata Lapeyr. - (rare)
Globularia trichosantha Fisch. et C.A. Mey. - (rare)

=== Hyacinthaceae ===
Bellevalia sarmatica (Georgi) Woronow - (declining)
Muscari coeruleum Losinsk. - (declining)
Muscari dolichanthum Woronow et Tron - (declining)
Scilla scilloides (Lindl.) Druce - (probably extinct)

=== Hydrangeaceae ===
Deutzia glabrata Kom. - (declining)
ydrangea petiolaris Siebold et Zucc. - (rare)
Schizophragma hydrangeoides Siebold et Zucc. - (endangered)

=== Hypericaceae ===
Hypericum mntbretti Spach - (rare)

=== Iridaceae ===
Belamcanda chinensis (L.) DC. - (endangered)
Crocus speciosus Bieb. - (declining)
Crocus tauricus (Trautv.) Puring - (uncertain)
Crocus vallicola Herb. - (declining)
Gladiolus palustris Gaudin - (probably extinct)
Iridodictyum reticulatum (Bieb.) Rodionenko - (declining)
Iris acutiloba C. A. Mey. - (endangered)
Iris aphylla L. - (declining)
Iris ensata Thunb. - (rare)
Iris ludwigii Maxim. - (declining)
Iris notha Bieb. - (declining)
Iris pumila L. s. l. - (rare)
Iris scariosa Willd. ex Link - (declining)
Iris tigridia Bunge - (rare)
Iris timofejewii Woronow - (declining)
Iris ventricosa Pall. - (rare)
Iris vorobievii N.S.Pavlova - (endangered)

=== Juglandaceae ===
Juglans ailanthifolia Carr. - (rare)
Pterocarya pterocarpa (Michx.) Kunth ex Iljinsk. - (rare)

=== Lamiaceae ===
Ajuga pyramidalis L. - (declining)
Hyssopus cretaceus Dubjan. - (rare)
Thymus cimicinus Blum ex Ledeb. - (rare)
Thymus pulchellus C. A. Mey. - (declining)

=== Liliaceae ===
Cardiocrinum cordatum (Thunb.) Makino - (declining)
Erythronium caucasicum Woronow - (rare)
Erythronium japonicum Decne. - (declining)
Erythronium sibiricum (Fisch. et C.A. Mey.) Kryl. - (rare)
Fritillaria caucasica Adams - (rare)
Fritillaria dagana Turcz. ex Trautv. - (rare)
Fritillaria meleagris L. - (rare)
Fritillaria ruthenica Wikstr. - (rare)
Fritillaria ussuriensis Maxim. - (rare)
Lilium callosum Siebold et Zucc. - (rare)
Lilium caucasicum (Miscz. ex Grossh.) Grossh. - (declining)
Lilium cernuum Kom. - (rare)
Lilium kesselringianum Miscz. - (declining)
Lilium lancifolium Thunb. - (rare)
Lilium pseudotigrinum Carr. - (declining)
Tulipa lipskyi Grossh. - (declining)
Tulipa schrenkii Regel - (declining); synonym of Tulipa suaveolens

=== Lobeliaceae ===
Lobelia dortmanna L. - (rare)

=== Magnoliaceae ===
Magnolia obovata Thunb. - (endangered)

=== Malvaceae ===
Tilia maximowicziana Shirasawa - (endangered)

=== Melanthiaceae ===
Bulbocodium versicolor (Ker-Gawl.) Spreng. - (declining)
Colchicum laetum Stev. - (rare)
Colchicum speciosum Stev. - (declining)
Colchicum umbrosum Stev. - (declining)

=== Menyanthaceae ===
Nymphoides coreana (Levl.) Hara - (endangered)

=== Myricaceae ===
Myrica gale L. - (declining)

=== Myrsinaceae ===
Cyclamen coum Mill. subsp. caucasicum (C. Koch) O. Schwarz - (rare)

=== Najadaceae ===
Caulinia flexilis Willd. - (declining)
Caulinia tenuissima (A. Br. ex Magnus) Tzvelev - (endangered)

=== Nelumbonaceae ===
Nelumbo nucifera Gaertn. - (rare)

=== Nitrariaceae ===
Peganum nigellastrum Bunge - (declining)

=== Nymphaeaceae ===
Euryale ferox Salisb. - (endangered)
Nuphar japonica DC. - (endangered)

=== Orchidaceae ===
Amitostigma kinoshitae (Makino) Schlechter - (rare)
Anacamptis pyramidalis (L.) Rich. - (rare)
Calypso bulbosa (L.) Oakes - (rare)
Cephalanthera damasonium (Mill.) Druce - (rare)
Cephalanthera erecta (Tunb.) Blume - (declining)
Cephalanthera floribunda Woronow - (declining)
Cephalanthera longibracteata Blume - (rare)
Cephalanthera longifolia (L.) Fritsch - (rare)
Cephalanthera rubra (L.) Rich. - (rare)
Cremastra variabilis (Blume) Nakai - (rare)
Cypripedium calceolus L. - (rare)
Cypripedium macranthon Sw. - (rare)
Cypripedium ventricosum Sw. - (rare)
Cypripedium yatabeanum Makino - (rare)
Dactylorhiza baltica (Klinge) Orlova - (rare)
Dactylorhiza majalis (Reichenb.) P.F. Hunt et Summerh. - (rare)
Dactylorhiza sambucina (L.) Soo - (endangered)
Dactylorhiza traunsteineri (Saut.) Soo s. l. - (rare)
Dactylorhiza urvilleana (Steudel) Baumann et Kuenkele - (rare)
Dactylostalyx ringens Reichenb. fil. - (uncertain)
Eleorchis japonica (A. Gray) F. Maek. - (declining)
Ephippianthus sachalinensis Reichenb. fil. - (uncertain)
Epipogium aphyllum Sw. - (declining)
Gastrodia elata Blume - (rare)
Gymnadenia odoratissima (L.) Rich. - (endangered)
Habenaria radiata (Thunb.) Spreng. - (declining)
Habenaria yezoensis Hara - (declining)
Himantoglossum caprinum (Bieb.) C. Koch - (endangered)
Himantoglossum formosum (Stev.) C. Koch - (endangered)
Limodorum abortivum (L.) Sw. - (rare)
Liparis japonica (Miq.) Maxim. - (rare)
Liparis krameri Franch. et Savat. - (rare)
Liparis kumokiri F. Maek. - (rare)
Liparis loeselii (L.) Rich. - (declining)
Liparis makinoana Schleih. - (rare)
Liparis sachalinensis Nakai - (rare)
Myrmechis japonica (Reichenb. fil.) Rolfe - (declining)
Neottia ussuriensis (Kom. et Nevski) Soo - (endangered)
Neottianthe cucullata (L.) Schlecht. - (rare)
Ophrys apifera Huds. - (endangered)
Ophrys caucasica Woronow ex Grossh. - (endangered)
Ophrys insectifera L. - (declining)
Ophrys oestrifera Bieb. - (declining)
Orchis coriophora L. s. l. - (declining)
Orchis mascula (L.) L. - (rare)
Orchis militaris L. - (rare)
Orchis morio L. - (endangered)
Orchis pallens L. - (endangered)
Orchis palustris Jacq. s. l. - (endangered)
Orchis picta Loisel. - (rare)
Orchis provincialis Balb. ex DC. - (endangered)
Orchis punctulata Stev. et Lindl. - (rare)
Orchis purpurea Huds. - (rare)
Orchis simia Lam. - (rare)
Orchis tridentata Scop. - (rare)
Orchis ustulata L. - (declining)
Platanthera camtschatica (Cham. et Schleih.) Makino - (rare)
Platanthera ophrydioides Fr.Schmidt - (rare)
Pogonia japonica Reichenb. fil. - (rare)
Ponerorchis pauciflora (Lindl.) Ohwi - (declining)
Serapias vomeracea (Burm. fil.) Briq. - (declining)
Spiranthes spiralis (L.) Chevall. - (rare)
Steveniella satyrioides (Stev.) Schleih. - (endangered)
Traunsteinera globosa (L.) C.Rchb. - (rare)
Traunsteinera sphaerica (Bieb.) Schleih. - (rare)
Tulotis ussuriensis (Regel et Maack) Hara - (rare)

=== Orobanchaceae ===
Castilleja arctica Krylov et Serg. - (rare)
Cymbochasma borysthenica (Pall. ex Schlecht.) Klok. et Zoz - (endangered)
Mannagettaea hummelii H. Smith - (declining)

=== Paeoniaceae ===
Paeonia caucasica (Schipcz.) Schipcz. - (rare)
Paeonia hybrida Pall. - (declining)
Paeonia lactiflora Pall. - (declining)
Paeonia obovata Maxim. - (rare)
Paeonia oreogeton S. Moore - (declining)
Paeonia tenuifolia L. - (declining)
Paeonia wittmanniana Hartwiss ex Lindl. - (endangered)

=== Papaveraceae ===
Glaucium flavum Crantz - (declining)
Papaver bracteatum Lindl. - (endangered)
Papaver lapponicum (Tolm.) Nordh. - (rare)
Papaver lisae N. Busch - (rare)
Papaver walpolei A.E.Porsild. - (rare)

=== Pedaliaceae ===
Trapella sinensis Oliv. - (rare)

=== Plantaginaceae ===
Linaria volgensis Rakov et Tzvelev - (declining)
Littorella uniflora (L.) Aschers. - (declining)
Veronica bogosensis Tumadzhanov - (declining)
Veronica filifolia Lipsky - (endangered)
Veronica sajanensis Printz - (rare)

=== Plumbaginaceae ===
Armeria vulgaris Willd. - (rare)
Limoniopsis owerinii (Boiss.) Lincz. - (rare)

=== Poaceae ===
Coleanthus subtilis (Tratt.) Seidel - (endangered)
Deschampsia turczaninowii Litv. - (declining)
Diandrochloa diarrhena (Schult. et Schult. fil.) A. N. Henry - (declining)
Dimeria neglecta Tzvelev - (endangered)
Elytrigia stipifolia (Czern. ex Nevski) Nevski - (declining)
Festuca bargusinensis Malyschev - (endangered)
Festuca sommieri Litard. - (rare)
Koeleria karavajevii Govor. - (rare)
Koeleria sclerophylla P.A.Smirn. - (rare)
Psathyrostachys daghestanica (Alexeenko) Nevski - (declining)
Psathyrostachys rupestris (Alexeenko) Nevski - (declining)
Secale kuprijanovii Grossh. - (declining)
Stipa consanguinea Trin. et Rupr. - (endangered)
Stipa dasyphylla (Lindem.) Trautv. - (rare)
Stipa pennata L. s. str. - (rare)
Stipa pulcherrima C. Koch - (rare)
Stipa syreistschikowii P.A.Smirn. - (endangered)
Stipa zalesskii Wilensky - (rare)
Tripogon chinensis (Franch.) Hack. - (declining)
Zingeria biebersteiniana (Claus) P.A.Smirn. - (declining)

=== Polygonaceae ===
Koenigia alaskana (syn. Aconogonon alaskanum) - (rare)
Polygonum amgense (syn. Aconogonon amgense) - (rare)
Rheum compactum L. - (declining, except for the populations in Irkutsk Oblast)

=== Primulaceae ===
Androsace koso-poljanskii Ovcz. - (rare)
Primula darialica Rupr. - (rare)
Primula juliae Kusn. - (declining)
Primula pinnata Popov et Fed. - (rare)
Primula renifolia Volgunov - (rare)
Primula sachalinensis Nakai - (rare)
Primula tschuktschorum Kjellm. - (rare)
Sredinskya grandis (Trautv.) Fed. - (rare)

=== Ranunculaceae ===
Aconitum biflorum Fisch. ex DC. - (rare)
Aconitum decipiens Worosch. et Anfalov - (declining)
Aconitum flerovii Steinb. - (declining)
Aconitum pascoi Worosch. - (rare)
Aconitum sajanense Kuminova - (declining)
Aconitum tanguticum (Maxim.) Stapf - (endangered)
Anemone baikalensis Turcz. ex Ledeb. - (rare)
Anemone blanda Schott et Kotschy - (rare)
Anemone uralensis Fisch. ex DC. - (declining)
Beckwithia glacialis (L.) A. et D. Love - (rare)
Delphinium puniceum Pall. - (declining)
Miyakea integrifolia Miyabe et Tatew. - (endangered)
Pulsatilla pratensis (L.) Mill. s. l. - (rare)
Pulsatilla vernalis (L.) Mill. - (declining)
Pulsatilla vulgaris Mill. - (endangered)
Ranunculus sajanensis Popov - (rare)

=== Rosaceae ===
Prunus pedunculata (Pall.) Maxim. - (rare)
Armeniaca mandshurica (Maxim.) B.Skvortsov - (rare)
Cotoneaster alaunicus Golitsin - (rare)
Cotoneaster cinnabarinus Juz. - (rare)
Cotoneaster lucidus Schltr. - (rare)
Exochorda serratifolia S. Moore - (endangered)
Potentilla beringensis Jurtzev - (endangered)
Potentilla eversmanniana Fisch. ex Ledeb. - (endangered)
Potentilla tollii Trautv. - (rare)
Potentilla volgarica Juz. - (endangered)
Prinsepia sinensis (Oliv.) Bean - (declining)
Sanguisorba magnifica I. Schischk. et Kom. - (endangered)
Sorbaria rhoifolia Kom. - (rare)
Sorbocotoneaster pozdnjakovii Pojarkov - (rare)

=== Ruscaceae ===
Ruscus colchicus P. F. Yeo - (declining)

=== Salicaceae ===
Salix gordejevii Chang et B.Skvortsov - (endangered)

=== Saxifragaceae ===
Chrysosplenium rimosum Kom. subsp. dezhnevii Jurtzev - (rare)
Saxifraga columnaris Schmalh. - (rare)
Saxifraga dinnikii Schmalh. - (rare)
Saxifraga korshinskii Kom. - (rare)
Saxifraga lactea Turcz. - (rare)

=== Scrophulariaceae ===
Scrophularia cretacea Fisch. ex Spreng. - (rare)

=== Solanaceae ===
Atropa bella-donna L. - (declining)

=== Staphyleaceae ===
Staphylea colchica Stev. - (rare)
Staphylea pinnata L. - (rare)

=== Thymelaeaceae ===
Daphne altaica Pall. - (probably extinct)
Daphne baksanica Pobed. - (endangered)
Daphne cneorum L. - (rare)
Stelleropsis altaica (Thieb.) Pobed. - (rare)
Stelleropsis caucasica Pobed. - (rare)

=== Valerianaceae ===
Valeriana ajanensis (Regel et Til.) Kom. - (rare)

=== Verbenaceae ===
Caryopteris mongholica Bunge - (rare)

=== Violaceae ===
Viola incisa Turcz. - (endangered)

=== Vitaceae ===
Ampelopsis japonica (Thunb.) Makino - (endangered)
Parthenocissus tricuspidata (Siebold et Zucc.) Planch. - (endangered)

== Sources ==
- Перечень объектов растительного мира, занесенных в Красную книгу Российской Федерации. Приложение 1 к приказу МПР России от 25 октября 2005 №289.
