= List of Aconitum species =

The following is a list of all 342 species in the plant genus Aconitum which are accepted by Plants of the World Online as of 20 June 2024.

== A ==
- Aconitum abietetorum W.T.Wang & L.Q.Li
- Aconitum × acuminatum Rchb.
- Aconitum acutiusculum H.R.Fletcher & Lauener
- Aconitum × acutum Rchb.
- Aconitum ajanense Steinb.
- Aconitum alboflavidum W.T.Wang
- Aconitum alboviolaceum Kom.
- Aconitum alpinonepalense Tamura
- Aconitum ambiguum Rchb.
- Aconitum amplexicaule Lauener
- Aconitum anglicum Stapf
- Aconitum angulatum Tamura
- Aconitum angusticassidatum Steinb.
- Aconitum angustifolium Bernh. ex Rchb.
- Aconitum anhuiense Lu Q.Huang, H.S.Peng & M.Z.Yin
- Aconitum anthora L.
- Aconitum apetalum (Huth) B.Fedtsch.
- Aconitum aquilonare A.Kern. ex Gáyer
- Aconitum aradanicum Stepanov
- Aconitum artemisiifolium A.I.Baranov & Skvortsov
- Aconitum arunii P.Agnihotri, D.Husain & T.Husain
- Aconitum asahikawaense Kadota
- Aconitum assamicum Lauener
- Aconitum × austriacum Mucher
- Aconitum austrokoreense Koidz.
- Aconitum axilliflorum Vorosch.
- Aconitum azumiense Kadota & Hashido

== B ==
- Aconitum baburinii (Vorosch.) Schlotgauer
- Aconitum baicalense (Regel) Turcz. ex Rapaics
- Aconitum bailangense Y.Z.Zhao
- Aconitum barbatum Patrin ex Pers.
- Aconitum × bartokianum Starm.
- Aconitum basitruncatum W.T.Wang
- Aconitum × baumgartenianum Simonk.
- Aconitum × bavaricum Starm.
- Aconitum × berdaui Zapał.
- Aconitum bhedingense Lauener
- Aconitum bhutanobulbilliferum Kadota
- Aconitum biflorum Fisch. ex DC.
- Aconitum brachypodum Diels
- Aconitum bracteolatum Lauener
- Aconitum brevicalcaratum (Finet & Gagnep.) Diels
- Aconitum brevilimbum Lauener
- Aconitum brevipes (W.T.Wang) Luferov & Erst
- Aconitum brevipetalum W.T.Wang
- Aconitum brunneum Hand.-Mazz.
- Aconitum bucovinense Zapał.
- Aconitum × bujbense Stepanov
- Aconitum bulbilliferum Hand.-Mazz.
- Aconitum bulleyanum Diels
- Aconitum burnatii Gáyer

== C ==
- Aconitum calthifolium H.F.Comber
- Aconitum × cammarum L.
- Aconitum campylorrhynchum Hand.-Mazz.
- Aconitum cannabifolium Franch. ex Finet & Gagnep.
- Aconitum carmichaelii Debeaux
- Aconitum castellanum (Molero & C.Blanché) Rottenst.
- Aconitum changianum W.T.Wang
- Aconitum charkeviczii Vorosch.
- Aconitum chasmanthum Stapf ex Holmes
- Aconitum chayuense W.T.Wang
- Aconitum chiachaense W.T.Wang
- Aconitum chiisanense Nakai
- Aconitum chilienshanicum W.T.Wang
- Aconitum chinense Paxton
- Aconitum chloranthum Hand.-Mazz.
- Aconitum chrysotrichum W.T.Wang
- Aconitum chuianum W.T.Wang
- Aconitum ciliare DC.
- Aconitum clusianum Rchb.
- Aconitum cochleare Vorosch.
- Aconitum columbianum Nutt.
- Aconitum consanguineum Vorosch.
- Aconitum contortum Finet & Gagnep.
- Aconitum coreanum (H.Lév.) Rapaics
- Aconitum corsicum Gáyer
- Aconitum crassiflorum Hand.-Mazz.
- Aconitum crassifolium Steinb.
- Aconitum cryptoviviparum Stepanov
- Aconitum curvipilum Riedl
- Aconitum cymbulatum (Schmalh.) Lipsky

== D ==
- Aconitum daxinganlinense Y.Z.Zhao
- Aconitum decipiens Vorosch. & Anfalov
- Aconitum degenii Gáyer
- Aconitum delavayi Franch.
- Aconitum delphiniifolium DC.
- Aconitum desoulavyi Kom.
- Aconitum dhwojii Lauener
- Aconitum diqingens Q.E.Yang & Z.D.Fang
- Aconitum dissectum D.Don
- Aconitum dolichorhynchum W.T.Wang
- Aconitum dolichostachyum W.T.Wang
- Aconitum × dragulescuanum Mucher
- Aconitum duclouxii H.Lév.
- Aconitum dunhuaense S.H.Li

== E ==
- Euphrasia eichleri W.R.Barker
- Aconitum elliotii Lauener
- Aconitum elwesii Stapf
- Aconitum episcopale H.Lév.
- Aconitum × exaltatum Bernh. ex Rchb.

== F ==
- Aconitum falciforme Hand.-Mazz.
- Aconitum fanjingshanicum W.T.Wang
- Aconitum ferox Wall. ex Ser.
- Aconitum finetianum Hand.-Mazz.
- Aconitum firmum Rchb.
- Aconitum fischeri Rchb.
- Aconitum flavum Hand.-Mazz.
- Aconitum flerovii Steinb.
- Aconitum fletcherianum G.Taylor
- Aconitum formosanum Tamura
- Aconitum forrestii Stapf
- Aconitum franchetii Finet & Gagnep.
- Aconitum × fudjisanense Nakai
- Aconitum fukutomei Hayata
- Aconitum funiculare Stapf
- Aconitum fusungense S.H.Li & Y.H.Huang

== G ==
- Aconitum gassanense Kadota & Sh.Kato
- Aconitum × gayeri Starmuhl
- Aconitum geniculatum H.R.Fletcher & Lauener
- Aconitum georgei H.F.Comber
- Aconitum gigas H.Lév. & Vaniot
- Aconitum glabrisepalum W.T.Wang
- Aconitum glandulosum Rapaics
- Aconitum grandibracteolatum (W.T.Wang) Luferov & Erst
- Aconitum grossedentatum (Nakai) Nakai
- Aconitum gubanovii Luferov & Vorosh.

== H ==
- Aconitum habaense W.T.Wang
- Aconitum × hakusanense Nakai
- Aconitum hamatipetalum W.T.Wang
- Aconitum haridasanii R.Tiwary, Harsh Singh & D.Adhikari
- Aconitum × hebegynum DC.
- Aconitum helenae Vorosch.
- Aconitum hemsleyanum E.Pritz.
- Aconitum henryi E.Pritz. ex Diels
- Aconitum heterophylloides (Brühl) Stapf
- Aconitum heterophyllum Wall. ex Royle
- Aconitum hezuoense W.T.Wang
- Aconitum hicksii Lauener
- Aconitum hiroshi-igarashii Kadota
- Aconitum hookeri Stapf
- Aconitum hopeiense (W.T.Wang) Vorosch.
- Aconitum huiliense Hand.-Mazz.

== I ==
- Aconitum ichangense (Finet & Gagnep.) Hand.-Mazz.
- Aconitum iidemontanum Kadota, Kita & Ueda
- Aconitum iinumae Kadota
- Aconitum ikedae Kadota
- Aconitum incisofidum W.T.Wang
- Aconitum infectum Greene
- Aconitum iochanicum Ulbr.
- Aconitum iranshahrii Riedl

== J ==
- Aconitum jaluense Kom.
- Aconitum japonicum Thunb.
- Aconitum jeholense Nakai & Kitag.
- Aconitum jenisseense Polozhij
- Aconitum jilongense W.T.Wang & L.Q.Li
- Aconitum jin-muratae Kadota & Nob.Tanaka

== K ==
- Aconitum kagerpuense W.T.Wang
- Aconitum kamelinii A.A.Solovjev
- Aconitum karafutense Miyabe & Nakai
- Aconitum karakolicum Rapaics
- Aconitum kashmiricum Stapf ex Coventry
- Aconitum khanminthunii A.A.Solovjev & Shmakov
- Aconitum kirghistanicum Kadota
- Aconitum kirinense Nakai
- Aconitum kitadakense Nakai
- Aconitum kiyomiense Kadota
- Aconitum komarovianum Nakai
- Aconitum kongboense Lauener
- Aconitum korshinskyi Tzvelev
- Aconitum krasnoboroffii Kadota
- Aconitum krylovii Steinb.
- Aconitum kunasilense Nakai
- Aconitum kungshanense W.T.Wang
- Aconitum kurilense Takeda
- Aconitum kurramense Qureshi & Chaudhri
- Aconitum kurtuschibinicum Stepanov
- Aconitum kusnezoffii Rchb.
- Aconitum kuzenevae Vorosch.

== L ==
- Aconitum laeve Royle
- Aconitum laevicaule W.T.Wang
- Aconitum lamarckii Rchb. ex Spreng.
- Aconitum lasianthum (Rchb.) Simonk.
- Aconitum lasiocarpum (Rchb.) Gáyer
- Aconitum lasiostomum Rchb. ex Besser
- Aconitum laxifoliatum W.T.Wang
- Aconitum legendrei Hand.-Mazz.
- Aconitum leiwuqiense W.T.Wang
- Aconitum lethale Griff.
- Aconitum leucostomum Vorosch.
- Aconitum liangshanicum W.T.Wang
- Aconitum lianhuashanicum W.T.Wang
- Aconitum liljestrandii Hand.-Mazz.
- Aconitum limprichtii Hand.-Mazz.
- Aconitum loczyanum Rapaics
- Aconitum longe-crassidatum Nakai
- Aconitum longilobum W.T.Wang
- Aconitum longipedicellatum Lauener
- Aconitum luanchuanense W.T.Wang
- Aconitum ludingense W.T.Wang
- Aconitum ludlowii Exell
- Aconitum lycoctonifolium W.T.Wang & L.Q.Li
- Aconitum lycoctonum L.

== M ==
- Aconitum macrorhynchum Turcz. ex Ledeb.
- Aconitum maninense (Skalický) Mitka
- Aconitum × mariae Rottenst., Mitka & A.V.Novikov
- Aconitum martjanovii Stepanov
- Aconitum mashikense Kadota & S.Umezawa
- Aconitum maximum Pall. ex DC.
- Aconitum metajaponicum Nakai
- Aconitum milinense W.T.Wang
- Aconitum miyabei Nakai
- Aconitum moldavicum Hacq.
- Aconitum monanthum Nakai
- Aconitum monticola Steinb.
- Aconitum moschatum (Brühl) Stapf

== N ==
- Aconitum nagarum Stapf
- Aconitum nakaoi Tamura
- Aconitum namlaense W.T.Wang
- Aconitum × nanum (Baumg.) Simonk.
- Aconitum napellus L.
- Aconitum naviculare (Brühl) Stapf
- Aconitum nemorum Popov
- Aconitum neosachalinense H.Lév.
- Aconitum neotortuosum Nakai
- Aconitum nevadense R.Uechtr. ex Gáyer
- Aconitum nielamuense W.T.Wang
- Aconitum nipponicum Nakai
- Aconitum noveboracense A.Gray ex Coville
- Aconitum novoaxillare W.T.Wang
- Aconitum novoluridum Munz
- Aconitum nutantiflorum P.K.Chang ex W.T.Wang

== O ==
- Aconitum ochotense Rchb.
- Aconitum ohmorii Kadota
- Aconitum okuyamae Nakai
- Aconitum orientale Mill.
- Aconitum orochryseum Stapf
- Aconitum ouvrardianum Hand.-Mazz.
- Aconitum ovatum Lindl.

== P ==
- Aconitum palmatum D.Don
- Aconitum paradoxum Rchb.
- Aconitum × parahakonense Nakai
- Aconitum parcifolium Q.E.Yang & Z.D.Fang
- Aconitum paskoi Vorosch.
- Aconitum pauciflorum Host
- Aconitum × pawlowskii Mitka & Starm.
- Aconitum pendulicarpum P.K.Chang ex W.T.Wang
- Aconitum pendulum N.Busch
- Aconitum pentheri Hayek
- Aconitum phyllostegium Hand.-Mazz.
- Aconitum piepunense Hand.-Mazz.
- Aconitum pilipes (Rchb.) Gáyer
- Aconitum pilopetalum W.T.Wang & L.Q.Li
- Aconitum × pilosiusculum (Ser.) Jacques
- Aconitum plicatum Köhler ex Rchb.
- Aconitum poluninii Lauener
- Aconitum polycarpum P.K.Chang ex W.T.Wang
- Aconitum polyschistum Hand.-Mazz.
- Aconitum pomeense W.T.Wang
- Aconitum popovii Steinb. & Schischk. ex Siplivinskii
- Aconitum potaninii Kom.
- Aconitum productum Rchb.
- Aconitum prominens Lauener
- Aconitum pseudobrunneum W.T.Wang
- Aconitum pseudodivaricatum W.T.Wang
- Aconitum pseudokongboense W.T.Wang & L.Q.Li
- Aconitum pseudokusnezowii Vorosch.
- Aconitum pseudolaeve Nakai
- Aconitum pseudostapfianum W.T.Wang
- Aconitum pterocaule Koidz.
- Aconitum pteropus Nakai
- Aconitum puchonroenicum Uyeki & Sakata
- Aconitum pulchellum Hand.-Mazz.

== Q ==
- Aconitum quelpaertense Nakai

== R ==
- Aconitum racemulosum Franch.
- Aconitum raddeanum Regel
- Aconitum ramulosum W.T.Wang
- Aconitum ranunculoides Turcz.
- Aconitum reclinatum A.Gray
- Aconitum refracticarpum P.K.Chang ex W.T.Wang
- Aconitum refractum (Finet & Gagnep.) Hand.-Mazz.
- Aconitum rhombifolium F.H.Chen
- Aconitum richardsonianum Lauener
- Aconitum rilongense Kadota
- Aconitum rockii H.R.Fletcher & Lauener
- Aconitum × ronnigeri Gáyer
- Aconitum rotundifolium Kar. & Kir.
- Aconitum rotundocassideum W.T.Wang
- Aconitum rubicundum (Ser.) Fisch. ex C.Young, J.Young & P.Young

== S ==
- Aconitum sachalinense F.Schmidt
- Aconitum sajanense Kuminova
- Aconitum sanyoense Nakai
- Aconitum scaposum Franch.
- Aconitum × schneebergense Gáyer
- Aconitum sczukinii Turcz.
- Aconitum secundiflorum W.T.Wang
- Aconitum senanense Nakai
- Aconitum septentrionale Koelle
- Aconitum seravschanicum Steinb.
- Aconitum × setosum Grinţ.
- Aconitum shennongjiaense Q.Gao & Q.E.Yang
- Aconitum sherriffii Lauener
- Aconitum sikkimensis Harsh Singh, A.Pradhan & D.Adhikari
- Aconitum sinchiangense W.T.Wang
- Aconitum sinoaxillare W.T.Wang
- Aconitum sinomontanum Nakai
- Aconitum smithii Ulbr. ex Hand.-Mazz.
- Aconitum soongaricum (Regel) Stapf
- Aconitum souliei Finet & Gagnep.
- Aconitum soyaense Kadota
- Aconitum spathulatum W.T.Wang
- Aconitum spiripetalum Hand.-Mazz.
- Aconitum staintonii Lauener
- Aconitum stapfianum Hand.-Mazz.
- Aconitum stoloniferum Vorosch.
- Aconitum stramineiflorum P.K.Chang ex W.T.Wang
- Aconitum stylosoides W.T.Wang
- Aconitum stylosum Stapf
- Aconitum subglandulosum Khokhr.
- Aconitum sukaczevii Steinb.
- Aconitum superbum Fritsch
- Aconitum × suspensum Nakai
- Aconitum swatense Tamura

== T ==
- Aconitum tabatae Tamura
- Aconitum taigicola Vorosch.
- Aconitum taipeicum Hand.-Mazz.
- Aconitum talassicum Popov
- Aconitum tangense Marquand & Airy Shaw
- Aconitum tanguticum (Maxim.) Stapf
- Aconitum tanzybeicum Stepanov
- Aconitum taronense (Hand.-Mazz.) H.R.Fletcher & Lauener
- Aconitum tatsienense Finet & Gagnep.
- Aconitum tauricum Wulfen
- Aconitum tawangense R.Tiwary, Harsh Singh & D.Adhikari
- Aconitum tenue Rydb.
- Aconitum tenuicaule W.T.Wang
- Aconitum tenuigaleatum W.T.Wang
- Aconitum × teppneri Mucher ex Starm.
- Aconitum tongolense Ulbr.
- Aconitum toxicum Rchb.
- Aconitum transsectum Diels
- Aconitum trisectum (W.T.Wang & L.Q.Li) Luferov & Erst
- Aconitum × triste Gáyer
- Aconitum tsaii W.T.Wang
- Aconitum tsariense Lauener
- Aconitum tuoliense W.T.Wang
- Aconitum turczaninowii Vorosch.

== U ==
- Aconitum umbrosum (Korsh.) Kom.
- Aconitum umezawae Kadota
- Aconitum uncinatum L.
- Aconitum urumqiense Z.Z.Yang

== V ==
- Aconitum variegatum L.
- Aconitum vilmorinianum Kom.
- Aconitum violaceum Jacquem. ex Stapf
- Aconitum vitosanum Gáyer
- Aconitum vivantii Rottenst.
- Aconitum volubile Pall. ex Koelle
- Aconitum vulparia Rchb.

== W ==
- Aconitum wajimanum Kadota
- Aconitum wangyedianense Y.Z.Zhao
- Aconitum williamsii Lauener
- Aconitum woroschilowii Luferov
- Aconitum wuchagouense Y.Z.Zhao
- Aconitum wulingense Nakai
- Aconitum wumengense J.He & E.D.Liu

== Y ==
- Aconitum yamazakii Tamura & Namba
- Aconitum yangii W.T.Wang & L.Q.Li
- Aconitum yinschanicum Y.Z.Zhao
- Aconitum yunlingense Q.E.Yang & Z.D.Fang
- Aconitum yuparense Takeda

== Z ==
- Aconitum zigzag H.Lév. & Vaniot
