= Cymbidium erectum =

Cymbidium erectum may refer to:

- Cymbidium erectum (Thunb.) Sw. 1799, a synonym of Cephalanthera erecta, an orchid species
- Cymbidium erectum Wight 1851, a synonym of Cymbidium aloifolium, an orchid species
