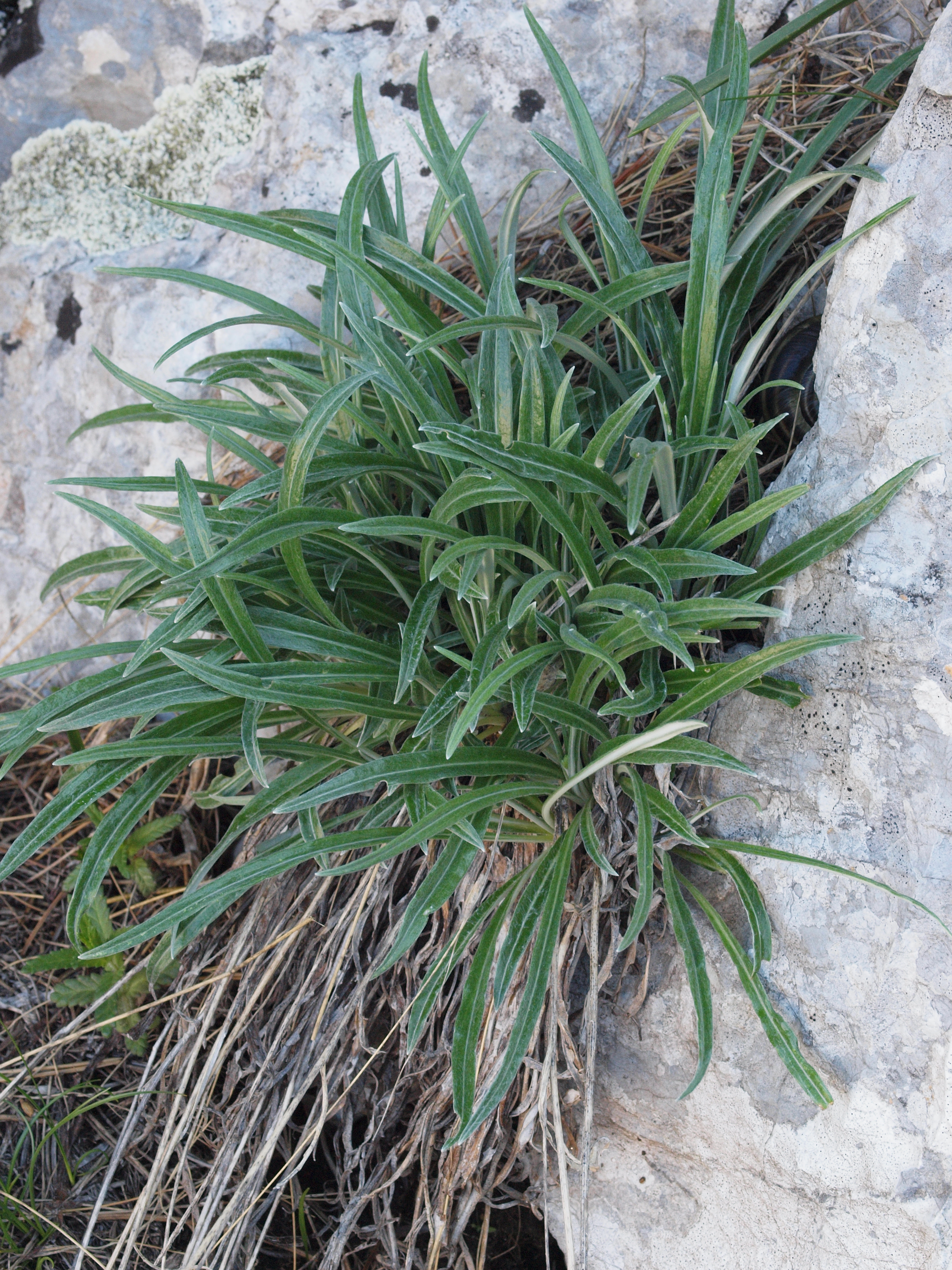
- Amphoricarpos neumayerii

Scientific classification
- Kingdom: Plantae
- Clade: Embryophytes
- Clade: Tracheophytes
- Clade: Angiosperms
- Clade: Eudicots
- Clade: Asterids
- Order: Asterales
- Family: Asteraceae
- Subfamily: Carduoideae
- Tribe: Cardueae
- Subtribe: Xerantheminae
- Genus: Amphoricarpos; Vis.

Type species
- Amphoricarpos neumayeri Vis.

Synonyms
- Alboviodoxa Woronow ex Woronow ex A. A. Grossheim

= Amphoricarpos =

Genus of flowering plants

Amphoricarpos is a genus of flowering plants in the family Asteraceae described as a genus in 1847.

Amphoricarpos is native to Asia Minor, the Caucasus, and the Balkan Peninsula (including Greece).

Species

- Amphoricarpos autariatus Bjelčić & E.Mayer - Albania, Greece, Bosnia-Herzegovina, Croatia, Serbia, Montenegro
- Amphoricarpos elegans Albov - Republic of Georgia
- Amphoricarpos exsul O.Schwarz - Asia Minor
- Amphoricarpos neumayerianus (Vis.) Greuter - Albania, Greece, Bosnia-Herzegovina, Croatia, Montenegro
- Amphoricarpos praedictus Ayasligil & Grierson - Asia Minor
