= Phyllonorycter viburni =

Scientific classification
- Kingdom: Animalia
- Phylum: Arthropoda
- Class: Insecta
- Order: Lepidoptera
- Family: Gracillariidae
- Genus: Phyllonorycter
- Species: P. viburni

Binomial name
- Phyllonorycter viburni (Kumata, 1963)

Synonyms
- Lithocolletis viburni Kumata, 1963

Species of moth

Phyllonorycter viburni is a moth of the family Gracillariidae. It is known from the islands of Honshu, Shikoku and Kyushu in Japan.

The wingspan is 6.5–8.5 mm.

The larvae feed as leaf miners on Viburnum dilatatum, Viburnum erosum and Viburnum wrightii.
