= Prangos eriantha =

Scientific classification
- Kingdom: Plantae
- Clade: Tracheophytes
- Clade: Angiosperms
- Clade: Eudicots
- Clade: Asterids
- Order: Apiales
- Family: Apiaceae
- Genus: Prangos
- Species: P. eriantha

Binomial name
- Prangos eriantha (DC.) Lyskov & Pimenov

Synonyms
- Alococarpum erianthum (DC.) Riedl & Kuber; Cachrys eriantha DC.

Species of plant

Prangos eriantha is a species of flowering plant in the family Apiaceae, native to Iran. It was first described by Augustin de Candolle in 1830 as Cachrys eriantha.
