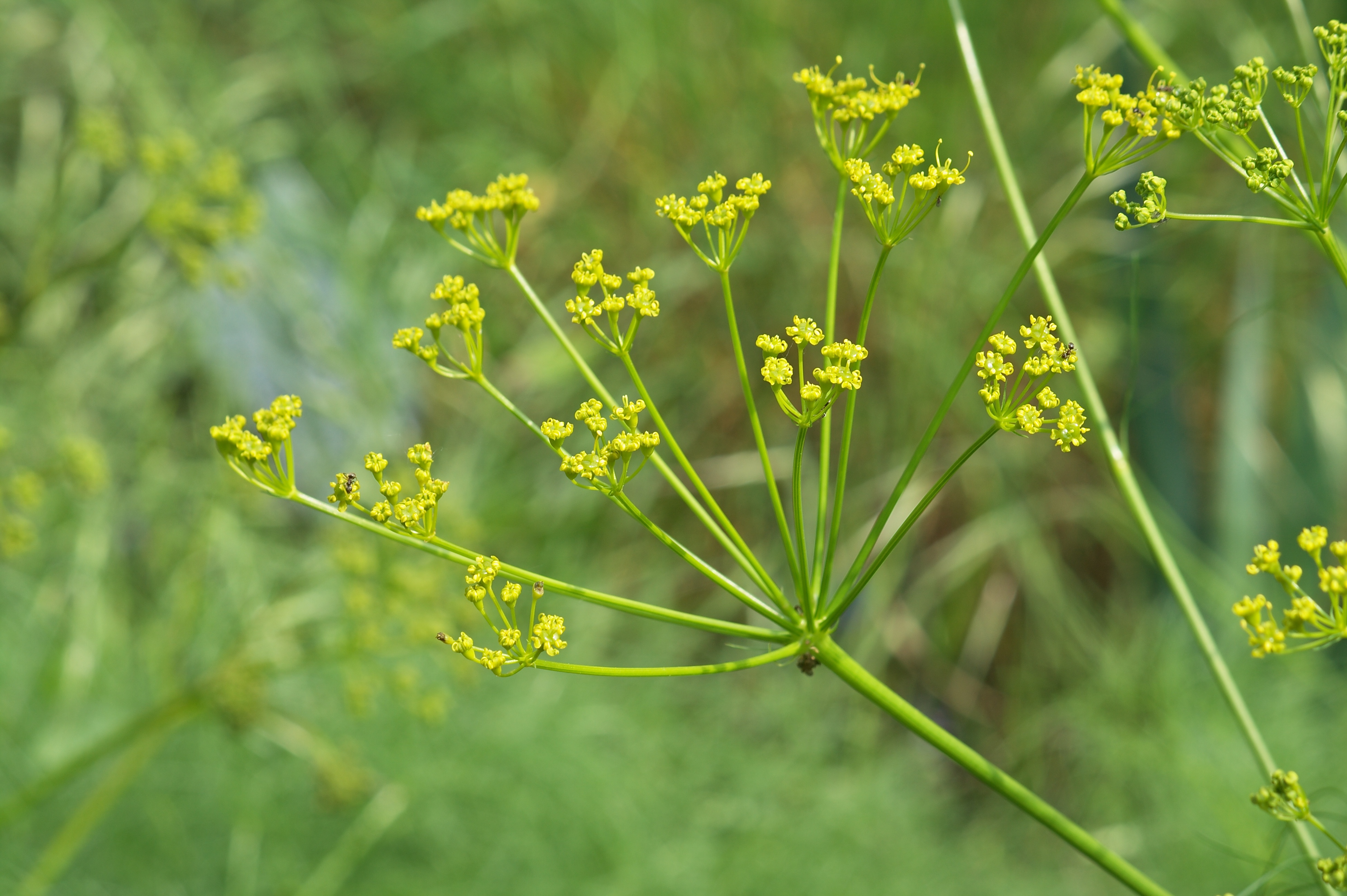
- Prangos trifida inflorescence

Scientific classification
- Kingdom: Plantae
- Clade: Tracheophytes
- Clade: Angiosperms
- Clade: Eudicots
- Clade: Asterids
- Order: Apiales
- Family: Apiaceae
- Subfamily: Apioideae
- Genus: Prangos; Lindl.

Species
- See text

Synonyms
- Alococarpum Riedl & Kuber; Cryptodiscus Schrenk ex Fisch. & C.A.Mey., nom. illeg.; Koelzella M.Hiroe; Microselinum Andrz. ex Trautv., nom. nud.; Neocryptodiscus Hedge & Lamond

= Prangos =

Genus of Apiaceae plants

Prangos is a genus of flowering plants of the family Apiaceae, native from Europe to Mongolia and the western Himalayas.

== Species ==
As of December 2022, Plants of the World Online accepted the following species:

- Prangos abieticola Aytaç & H.Duman
- Prangos acaulis (DC.) Bornm.
- Prangos akymatodes Rech.f. & Riedl
- Prangos ammophila (Bunge) Pimenov & V.N.Tikhom.
- Prangos aricakensis Behçet & Yapar
- Prangos asperula Boiss.
- Prangos bucharica O.Fedtsch.
- Prangos cachroides (Schrenk) Pimenov & V.N.Tikhom.
- Prangos calligonoides Rech.f.
- Prangos carinata Griseb. ex Degen
- Prangos cheilanthifolia Boiss.
- Prangos corymbosa Boiss.
- Prangos crossoptera Herrnst. & Heyn
- Prangos denticulata Fisch. & C.A.Mey.
- Prangos didyma (Regel) Pimenov & V.N.Tikhom.
- Prangos dzhungarica Pimenov
- Prangos equisetoides Kuzjmina
- Prangos eriantha (DC.) Lyskov & Pimenov
- Prangos fedtschenkoi (Regel & Schmalh.) Korovin
- Prangos ferulacea (L.) Lindl.
- Prangos gaubae (Bornm.) Herrnst. & Heyn
- Prangos herderi (Regel) Herrnst. & Heyn
- Prangos hermonis Boiss.
- Prangos heyniae H.Duman & M.F.Watson
- Prangos hulusii Şenol, Yıldırım & Seçmen
- Prangos ilanae Pimenov, Akalın & Kljuykov
- Prangos lachnantha (Korovin) Pimenov & Kljuykov
- Prangos latiloba Korovin
- Prangos ledebourii Herrnst. & Heyn
- Prangos lipskyi Korovin
- Prangos longistylis (Boiss.) Pimenov & Kljuykov
- Prangos meliocarpoides Boiss.
- Prangos multicostata Kljuykov & Lyskov
- Prangos odontalgica (Pall.) Herrnst. & Heyn
- Prangos ornata Kuzjmina
- Prangos pabularia Lindl.
- Prangos persica (Boiss.) Pimenov
- Prangos peucedanifolia Fenzl
- Prangos platychlaena Boiss.
- Prangos scabrifolia Post & Beauverd
- Prangos serpentinica (Rech.f., Aellen & Esfand.) Herrnst. & Heyn
- Prangos trifida (Mill.) Herrnst. & Heyn
- Prangos tschimganica O.Fedtsch.
- Prangos tuberculata Boiss. & Hausskn.
- Prangos turcica A.Duran, Sağiroğlu & H.Duman
- Prangos uechtritzii Boiss. & Hausskn.
- Prangos uloptera DC.
