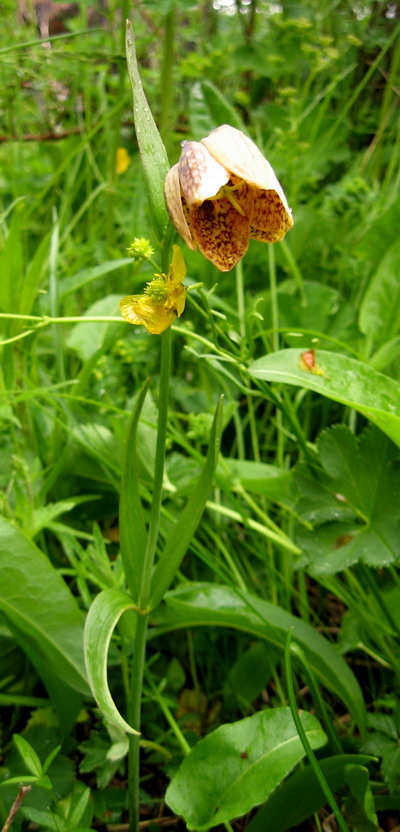

Scientific classification
- Kingdom: Plantae
- Clade: Tracheophytes
- Clade: Angiosperms
- Clade: Monocots
- Order: Liliales
- Family: Liliaceae
- Subfamily: Lilioideae
- Genus: Fritillaria
- Species: F. dagana

Binomial name
- Fritillaria dagana Turcz.

Synonyms
- Imperialis dagana (Turcz.) Turcz.

= Fritillaria dagana =

Species of flowering plant

Fritillaria dagana is a rare bulbous herbaceous perennial plant native to Siberia, Russia. It is a species in the genus Fritillaria of the family Liliaceae. It is placed in the subgenus Liliorhiza.

== Description ==
Fritillaria dagana reaches a height of 20–35 cm. It produces a single pendant campanulate flower, brown-violet on the outside, yellowish and mottled inside. The perianth segments are 4 cm in length and 10–13 mm in width. Leaves are lanceolate, 6–8 cm in length and arranged in a single whorl of 2–5 in the upper part of the stem, with only the occasional upper leaf more distally. The fruit is an elongated capsule. The number of chromosomes is 2n = 24.

== Taxonomy ==
It was described by Turczaninow in 1834 near Lake Baikal in Siberia when he was working there. Baker (1874), who divided Fritillaria into subgenera, placed F. dagana in subgenus Goniocarpa, a subgenus later subsumed into Fritillaria. Modern classifications, based on molecular phylogenetics, place it in Liliorhiza, a subgenus that it predominantly North American. Within Liliorhiza, F. dagana is one of a small number of species found in north west Asia, forming a grade with the remainder of the subgenus (see Day et al. 2014 Fig. 2). It was originally included in Liliorhiza on account of its multi-scaled bulbs.

== Distribution and habitat ==
Fritillaria dagana is endemic to southern Siberia, specifically the Irkutsk, and Chita regions and the Republics of Buryatia, Tuva, and Yakutia. It is alpine and subalpine in habitat, on the edges of forests edges and grassy slopes.

== Cultivation ==
Fritillaria dagana blooms from mid June to mid July.

== Conservation ==
The species is endangered by flower picking and is listed in the red books for the region.

== Bibliography ==
- Baker, J. G. (1874). "Revision of the Genera and Species of Tulipeae". Botanical Journal of the Linnean Society. XIV (76). F. dagana p. 271. doi:10.1111/j.1095-8339.1874.tb00314.x.
- Erst, A.A.; Erst, A.S. (2011). "In vitro propagation of rare plant Fritillaria dagana Turcz. ex Trautv. from bulb scales" (PDF). Turczaninowia (in Russian). 14 (4): 9093.
- Day, Peter D.; Berger, Madeleine; Hill, Laurence; Fay, Michael F.; Leitch, Andrew R.; Leitch, Ilia J.; Kelly, Laura J. (November 2014). "Evolutionary relationships in the medicinally important genus Fritillaria L. (Liliaceae)". Molecular Phylogenetics and Evolution. 80: 11–19. doi:10.1016/j.ympev.2014.07.024. PMID 25124097.
- Rønsted, N.; Law, S.; Thornton, H.; Fay, M. F.; Chase, M. W. (2005). "Molecular phylogenetic evidence for the monophyly of Fritillaria and Lilium (Liliaceae; Liliales) and the infrageneric classification of Fritillaria". Molecular Phylogenetics and Evolution. 35 (3): 509–527. doi:10.1016/j.ympev.2004.12.023. PMID 15878122.
- TPL (2013). "The Plant List 1.1: Fritillaria dagana Turcz". Royal Botanic Gardens, Kew and Missouri Botanical Garden.
- WCSP. "Fritillaria dagana Turcz.". World Checklist of Selected Plant Families (WCSP). Royal Botanic Gardens, Kew.
- IPNI (2005). "Fritillaria dagana Turcz.". International Plant Names Index.
- "Fritillaria dagana". Fritillaria species: A. Fritillaria Group, Alpine Garden Society.
- Roskov Y.; Kunze T.; Orrell T.; Abucay L.; Paglinawan L.; Culham A.; Bailly N.; Kirk P.; Bourgoin T.; Baillargeon G.; Decock W.; De Wever A.; Didžiulis V., eds. (2014). "Fritillaria dagana Regel". Species 2000 & ITIS Catalogue of Life: 2014 Annual Checklist. Naturalis, Leiden, the Netherlands: ITIS, Royal Botanic Gardens, Kew.
- "Enumeratio plantarum phaenogamarum et filicum Florae Baikalensis, cura Turtschaninof: Fritillaria dagana T. p. 25". Flora Oder Botanische Zeitung: Welche Recensionen, Abhandlungen, Aufsätze, Neuigkeiten und Nachrichten, die Botanik Betreffend, Enthält. 17 (1): 4–28. 1834.
- Malyschev, L I (2001). Flora of Siberia: Araceae-Orchidaceae. Taylor & Francis. ISBN 978-1-57808-103-5.
- "Fritillaria dagana". Рябчик дагана в Красной книге Иркутской области. Сайт «ООПТ России».
- "Fritillaria dagana Turcz". eMonocot. Royal Botanic Gardens, Kew.
