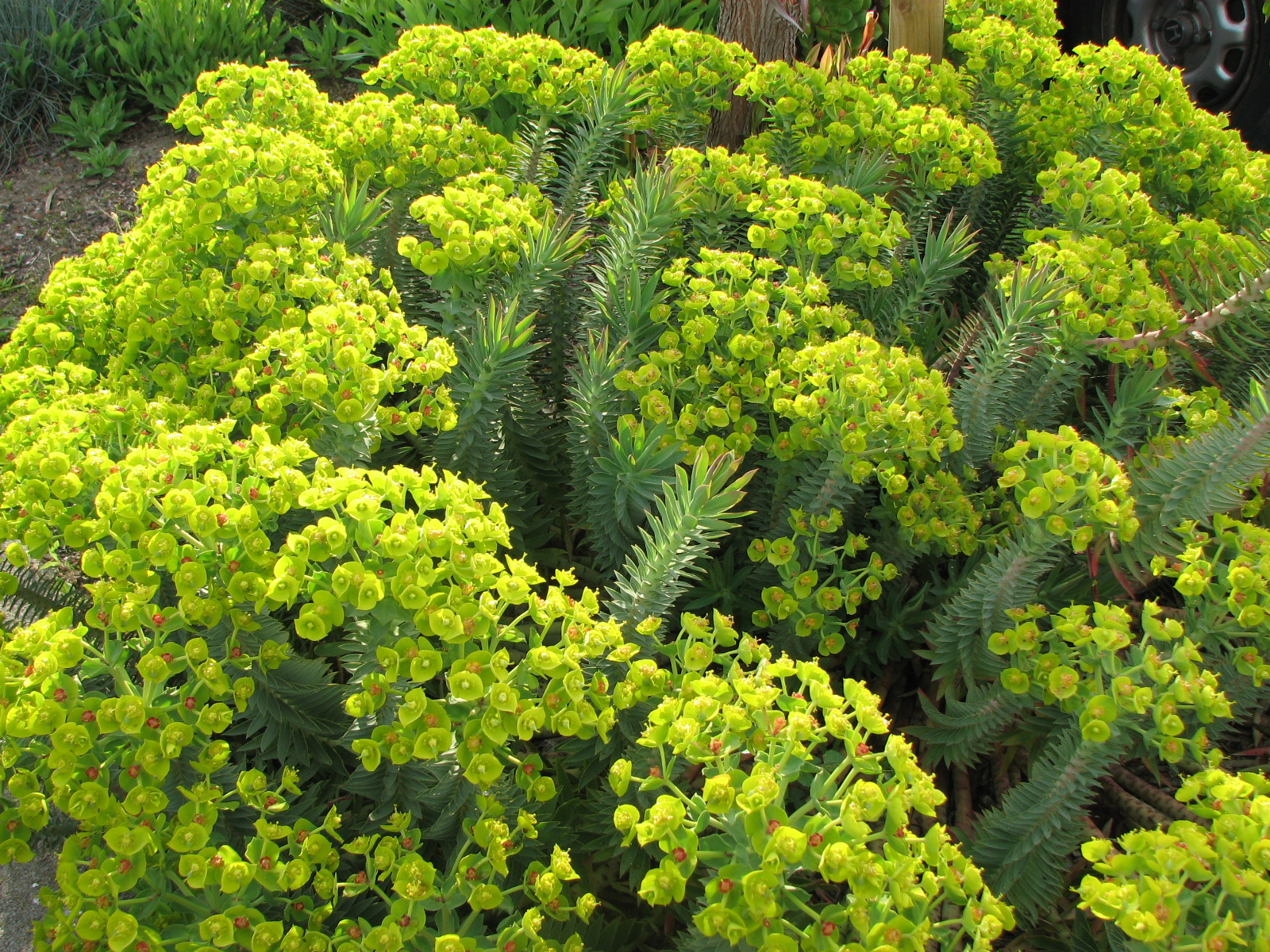
- Gopher spurge has an unusual green flower with tiny yellow/orange petals in its center

Scientific classification
- Kingdom: Plantae
- Clade: Tracheophytes
- Clade: Angiosperms
- Clade: Eudicots
- Clade: Rosids
- Order: Malpighiales
- Family: Euphorbiaceae
- Genus: Euphorbia
- Species: E. rigida

Binomial name
- Euphorbia rigida M.Bieb.

Synonyms
- Euphorbia biglandulosa Desf.

= Euphorbia rigida =

Species of flowering plant

Euphorbia rigida, the gopher spurge or upright myrtle spurge, is a species of flowering plant in the spurge family Euphorbiaceae, native to southern Europe and southwest Asia. Growing to 50 cm (20 in) tall and broad, it is a bushy evergreen perennial with somewhat fleshy leaves arranged in a spiral, bearing bunches of bright yellow flowers in late Spring.

In its native Mediterranean Basin and the Middle East it is considered a weed. It has appeared spontaneously in the California wilderness but is not considered a noxious weed.

== Gardening ==
This plant is commonly used as an ornamental in temperate gardens of Europe and North America, where it is valued as a relatively trouble-free specimen for drought-resistant and low-maintenance situations. It is especially useful for underplanting larger shrubs such as roses. It performs best in well-drained soil in the sun or light shade. It has gained the Royal Horticultural Society's Award of Garden Merit.

== Toxicity ==
As with others of the genus, all parts of the plant are toxic if eaten. When cut or broken, the wounds leak a milky sap which can cause skin irritation.

== Biofuels ==
Research has been done on using Euphorbia rigida as a bio fuel. It has been shown to produce 137 gallons of oil per acre.

Pyrolysis Reactor Type:	Fixed Bed
Process Type:	Hydropyrolysis
