= Elisabeth Ivanovna Steinberg =

Russian botanist (1884–1963)

Elisabeth Ivanovna Steinberg (Russian: Штейнберг, Елизавета Ивановна; 1884–1963) was a Soviet botanist noted for studying the plants of North Asia, including Russia and Kazakhstan. She worked at Tomsk State University and St. Petersburg State University. During the siege of Leningrad in the Second World War, she was among those protecting the Peterhof Natural Science Institute.

She identified at least 30 species. The standard author abbreviation Steinb. is used to indicate this person as the author when citing a botanical name.
