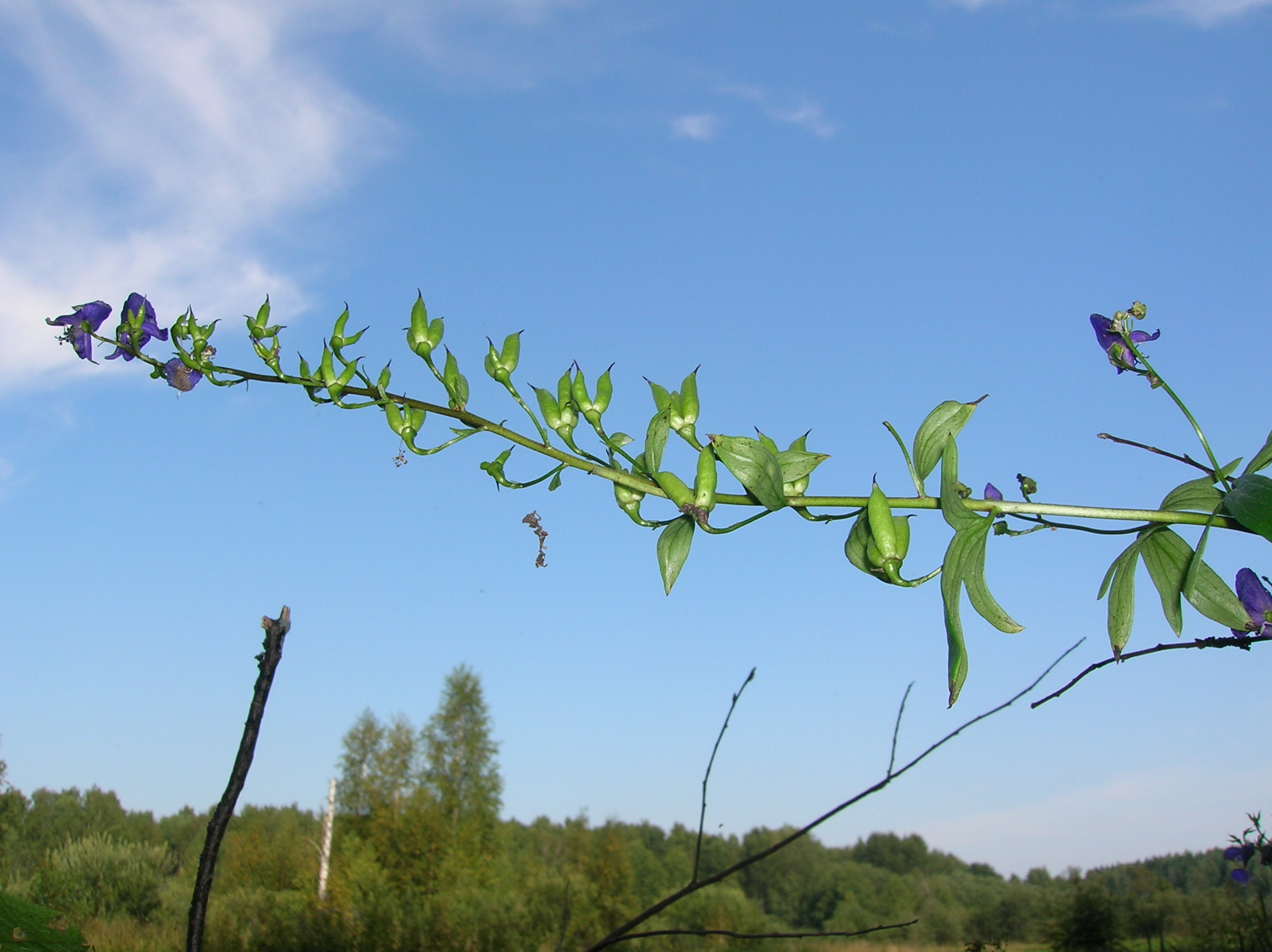

Scientific classification
- Kingdom: Plantae
- Clade: Embryophytes
- Clade: Tracheophytes
- Clade: Angiosperms
- Clade: Eudicots
- Order: Ranunculales
- Family: Ranunculaceae
- Genus: Aconitum
- Species: A. flerovii

Binomial name
- Aconitum flerovii Steinb.

= Aconitum flerovii =

Species of flowering plant

Aconitum flerovii is a species of flowering plant in the family Ranunculaceae. It is native to Central European Russia, and was described in 1937.

== Taxonomy ==
The species was described by Elisabeth Ivanovna Steinberg in 1937.

== Distribution ==
Aconitum flerovii is native to the temperate biome of Central European Russia.

== Description ==
Aconitum flerovii is a perennial, or has underground storage organs.

== Conservation ==
Aconitum flerovii is strictly protected under the Berne Convention on the Conservation of European Wildlife and Natural Habitats.
