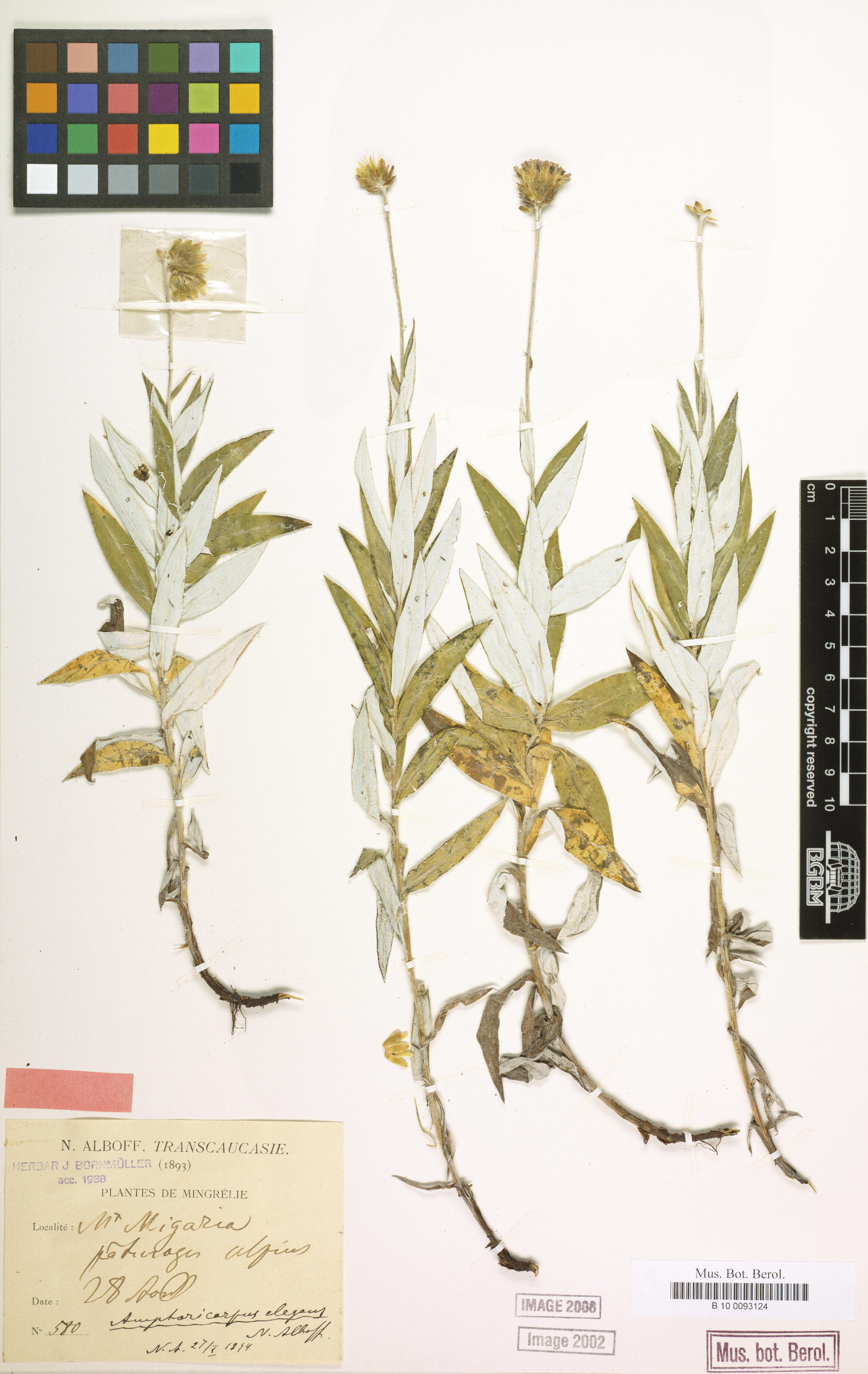
- Amphoricarpos elegans - Mt Migaria (Georgia)

Scientific classification
- Kingdom: Plantae
- Clade: Tracheophytes
- Clade: Angiosperms
- Clade: Eudicots
- Clade: Asterids
- Order: Asterales
- Family: Asteraceae
- Genus: Amphoricarpos
- Species: A. elegans

Binomial name
- Amphoricarpos elegans Albov

Synonyms
- Alboviodoxa elegans (Albov) Woronow ex Grossh., 1949; Amphoricarpos kuznetzowii C. Winkl. & Lipsky

= Amphoricarpos elegans =

Species of flowering plant

Amphoricarpos elegans is a species of flowering plants in the family Asteraceae. It is found in Georgia.
