= Carex erythrobasis =

Scientific classification
- Kingdom: Plantae
- Clade: Tracheophytes
- Clade: Angiosperms
- Clade: Monocots
- Clade: Commelinids
- Order: Poales
- Family: Cyperaceae
- Genus: Carex
- Species: C. erythrobasis

Binomial name
- Carex erythrobasis H.Lév. & Vaniot

Synonyms
- Carex hallaisanensis H.Lév. & Vaniot; Carex pedunculata subsp. erythrobasis (H.Lév. & Vaniot) A.Haines; Carex pedunculata var. erythrobasis (H.Lév. & Vaniot) T.Koyama

Species of plant

Carex erythrobasis, the red-based leaf sedge, is a species of flowering plant in the family Cyperaceae, native to Manchuria, Korea, and Primorsky Krai in Russia. It is found in the understory of both broadleaf and Korean pine forests.
