= Allium grande =

Scientific classification
- Kingdom: Plantae
- Clade: Tracheophytes
- Clade: Angiosperms
- Clade: Monocots
- Order: Asparagales
- Family: Amaryllidaceae
- Subfamily: Allioideae
- Genus: Allium
- Species: A. grande

Binomial name
- Allium grande Lipsky

Synonyms
- Allium chelotum Wendelbo; Allium decipiens var. latissimum Lipsky

Species of flowering plant

Allium grande is a species of flowering plant in the family Amaryllidaceae. The species is native to Iran and the North Caucasus, and was described in 1894.

== Taxonomy ==
The species was described by Vladimir Lipsky in 1894.

== Distribution ==
Allium grande is native to the temperate biome of Iran and the North Caucasus.

== Description ==
Allium grande has underground storage organs.
