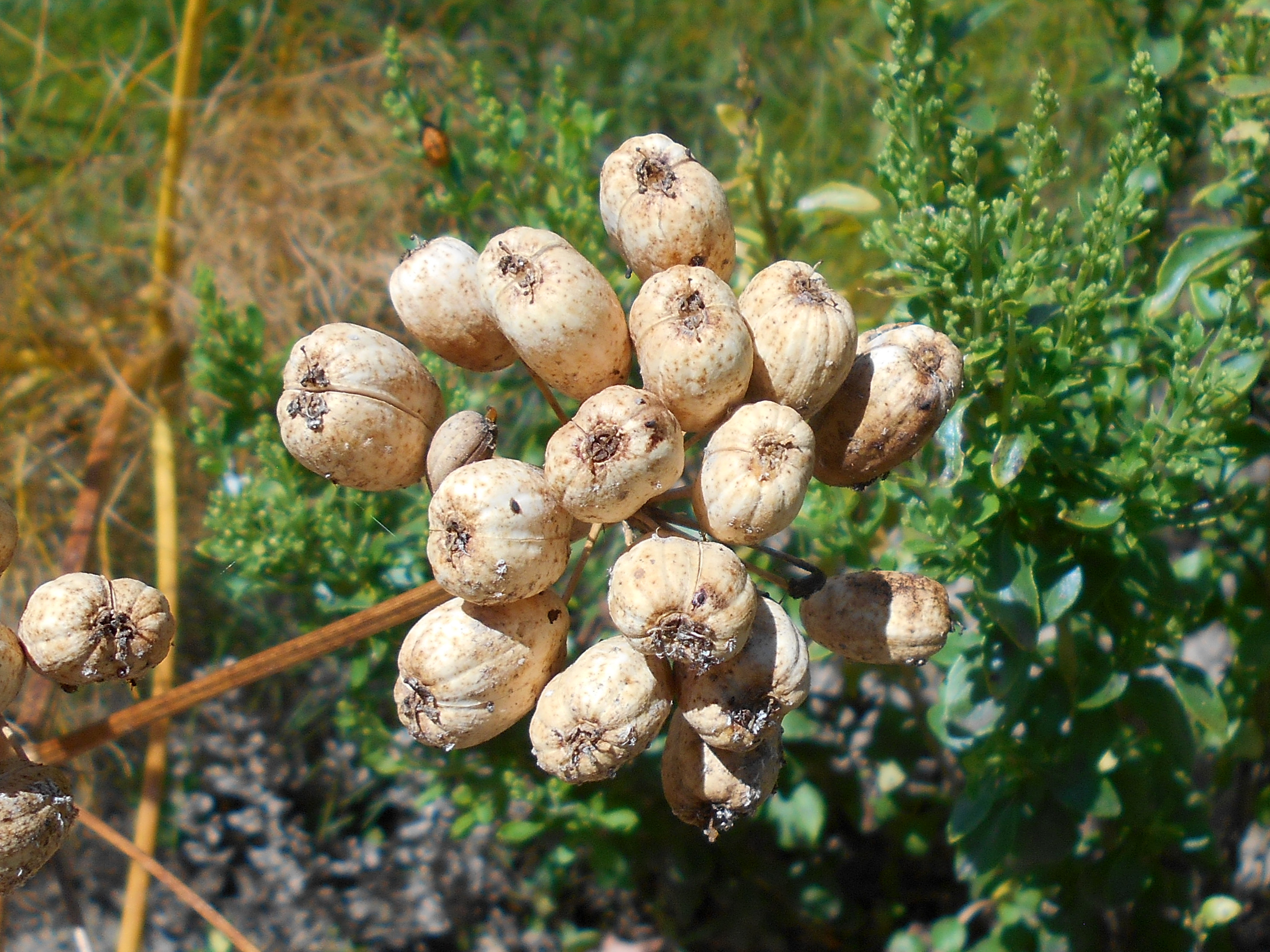

Scientific classification
- Kingdom: Plantae
- Clade: Tracheophytes
- Clade: Angiosperms
- Clade: Eudicots
- Clade: Asterids
- Order: Apiales
- Family: Apiaceae
- Genus: Prangos
- Species: P. trifida

Binomial name
- Prangos trifida (Mill.) Herrnst. & Heyn

Synonyms
- Armarintea trifida (Mill.) Samp.; Cachrys trifida Mill.; Armarintea morisonii Bubani; Cachrys laevigata Lam.; Cachrys libanotis Gouan; Cachrys morisonii All.; Cachrys trifida var. aragonensis (Molero) O.Bolòs & Vigo; Prangos trifida var. aragonensis Molero

= Prangos trifida =

Species of flowering plant

Prangos trifida is a species of flowering plant native to southern Europe. It occurs in France, Italy, Spain, Portugal, Albania, Serbia, Kosovo, Macedonia, Romania, Bulgaria, and Crimea.
