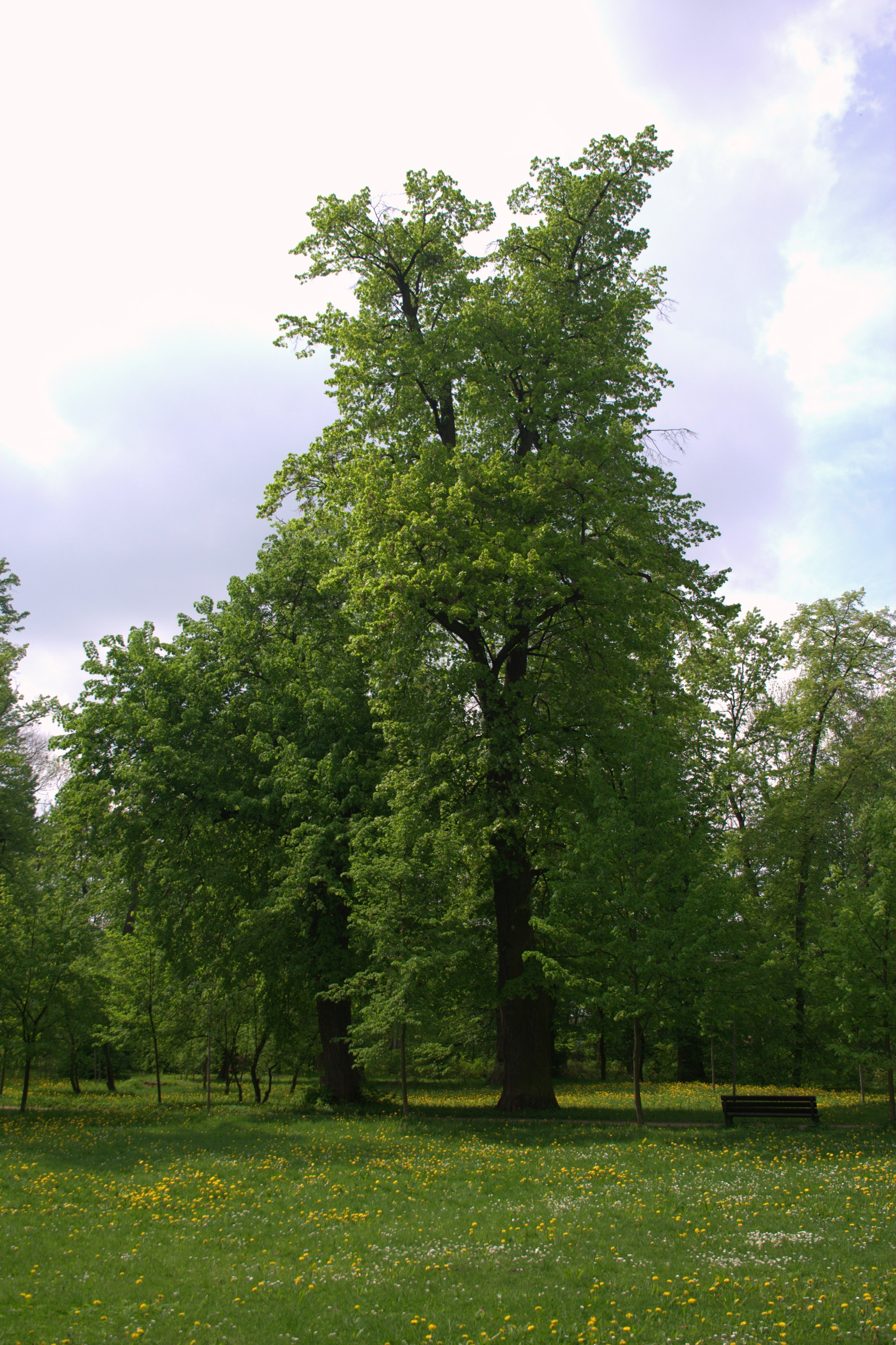
- Habit
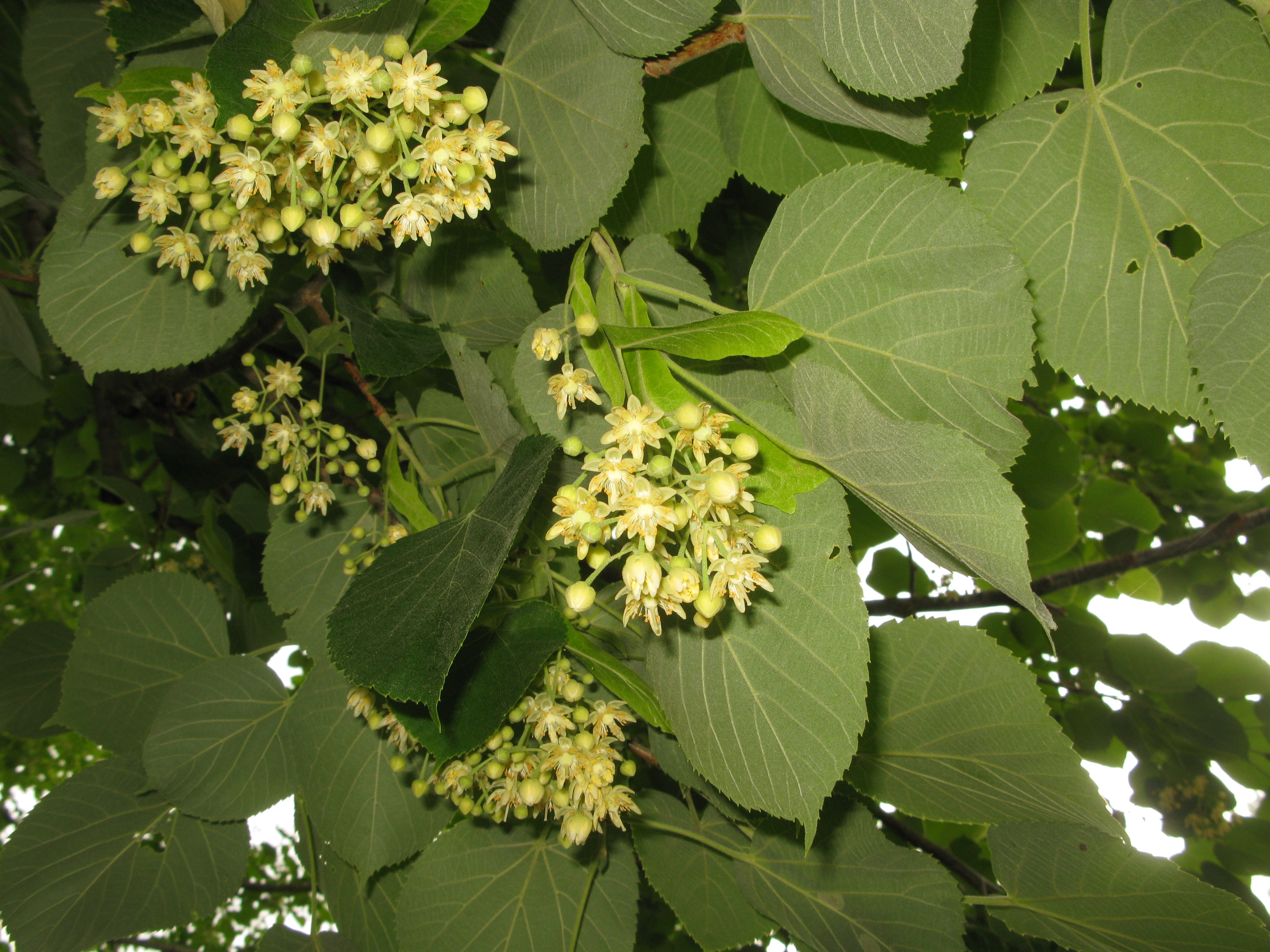
- Leaves and flowers

Scientific classification
- Kingdom: Plantae
- Clade: Embryophytes
- Clade: Tracheophytes
- Clade: Spermatophytes
- Clade: Angiosperms
- Clade: Eudicots
- Clade: Rosids
- Order: Malvales
- Family: Malvaceae
- Genus: Tilia
- Species: T. maximowicziana

Binomial name
- Tilia maximowicziana Shiras.

Synonyms
- Tilia miyabei J.G.Jack

= Tilia maximowicziana =

Species of flowering plant

Tilia maximowicziana is a species of flowering plant in the lime and linden genus Tilia, family Malvaceae. It is native to central and northern Japan, and Kunashir Island, the southernmost of the Kuril Islands. In the mountain forests of Hokkaido and northern Honshu it is often a dominant canopy species. A handsome tree, little planted outside its native range, it is available from commercial suppliers.
