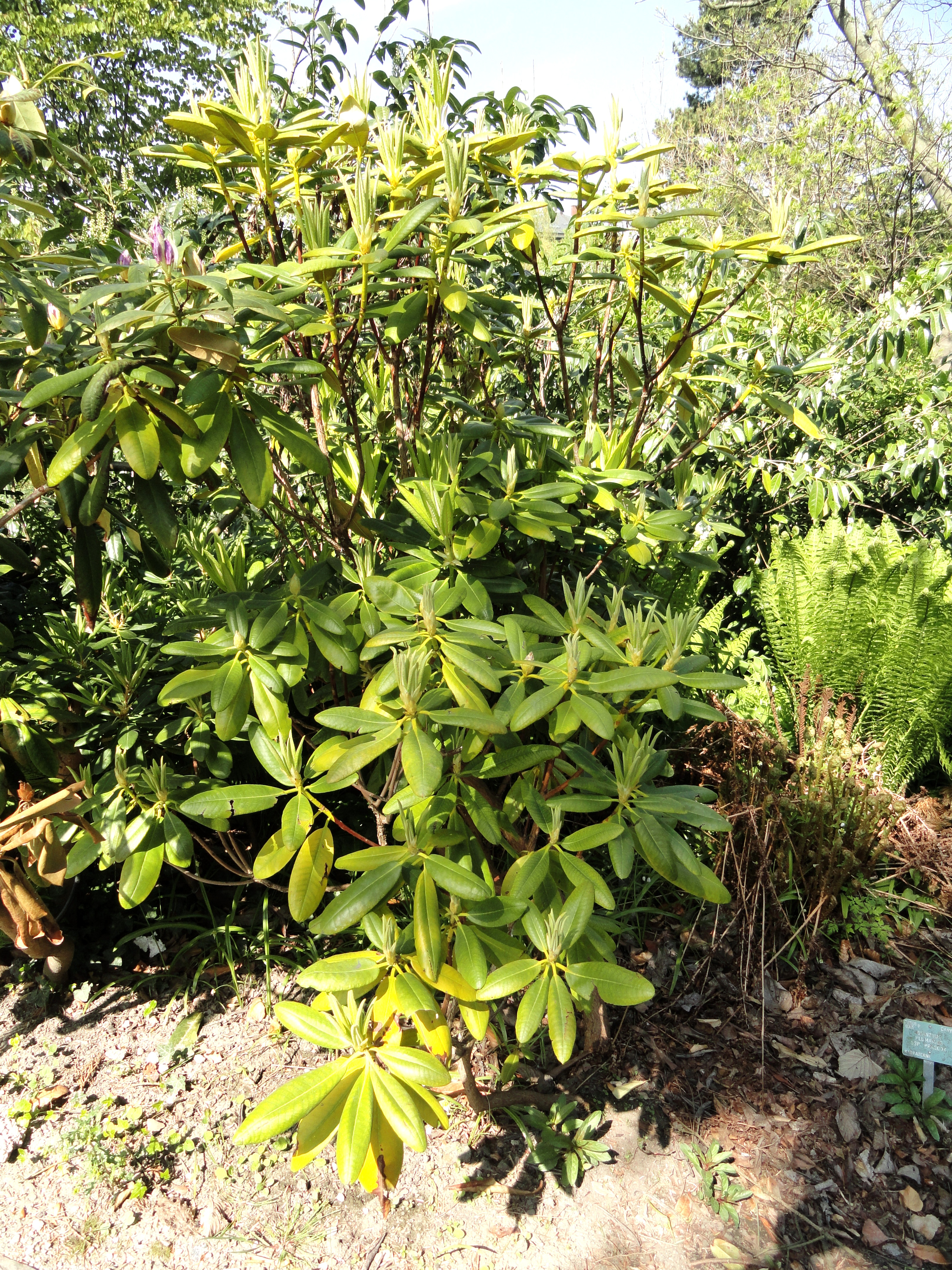

Scientific classification
- Kingdom: Plantae
- Clade: Tracheophytes
- Clade: Angiosperms
- Clade: Eudicots
- Clade: Asterids
- Order: Ericales
- Family: Ericaceae
- Genus: Rhododendron
- Species: R. fauriei

Binomial name
- Rhododendron fauriei Franch.

Synonyms
- Rhododendron brachycarpum auct.

= Rhododendron fauriei =

Species of plant

Rhododendron fauriei is a rhododendron species native to Japan and Korea. Its flower's colors are light red to white.

== Taxonomy ==
A double-flowered form of this species is known as Rhododendron brachycarpum f. nemotoanum (syn. R. fauriei f. nemotoanum), commonly called Nemoto-shakunage in Japan. It was designated as the official prefectural flower of Fukushima in 1955.

Rhododendron brachycarpum f. nemotoanum (Nemoto-shakunage) on Mount Azuma

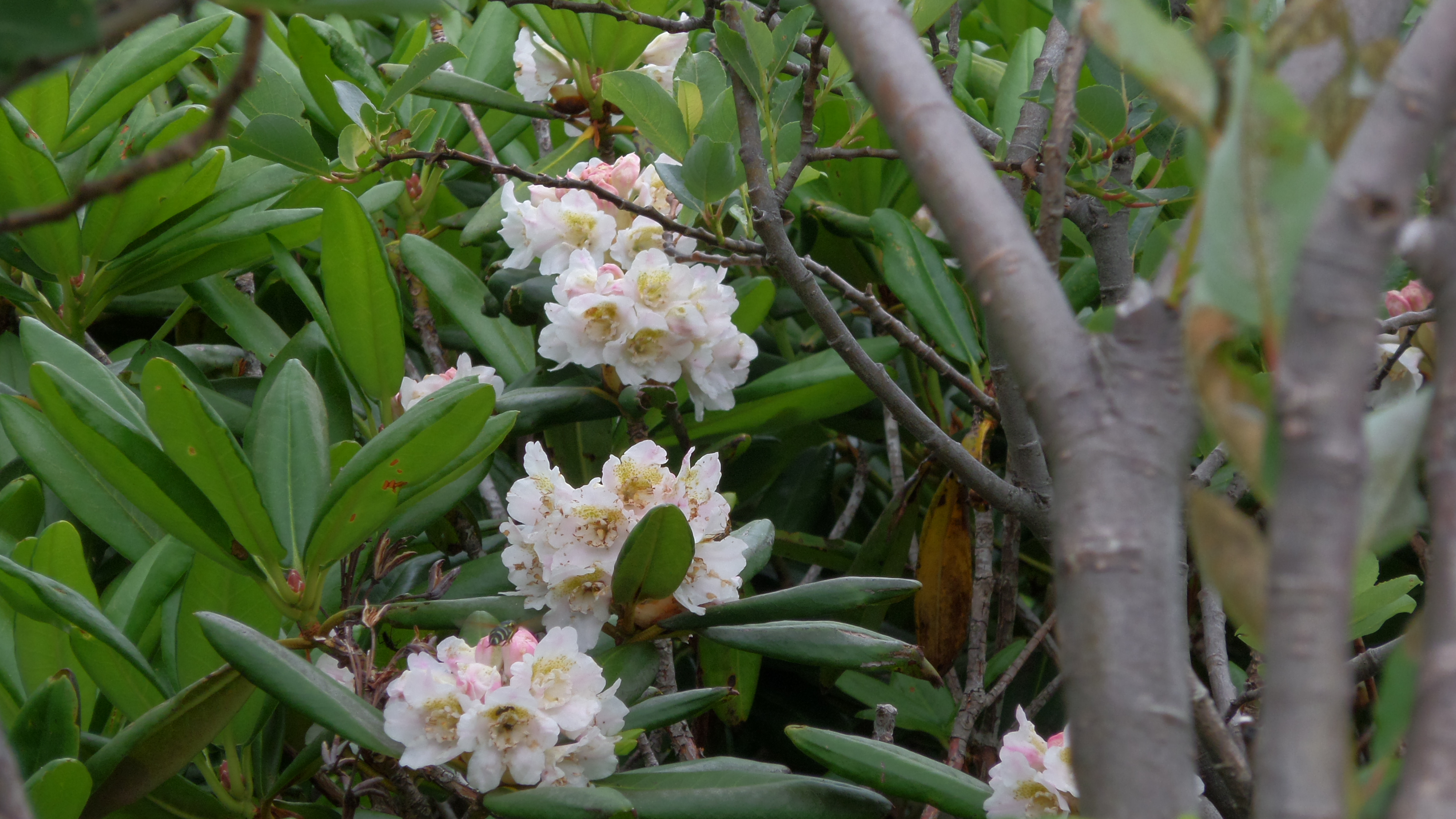
Double-flowered blooms

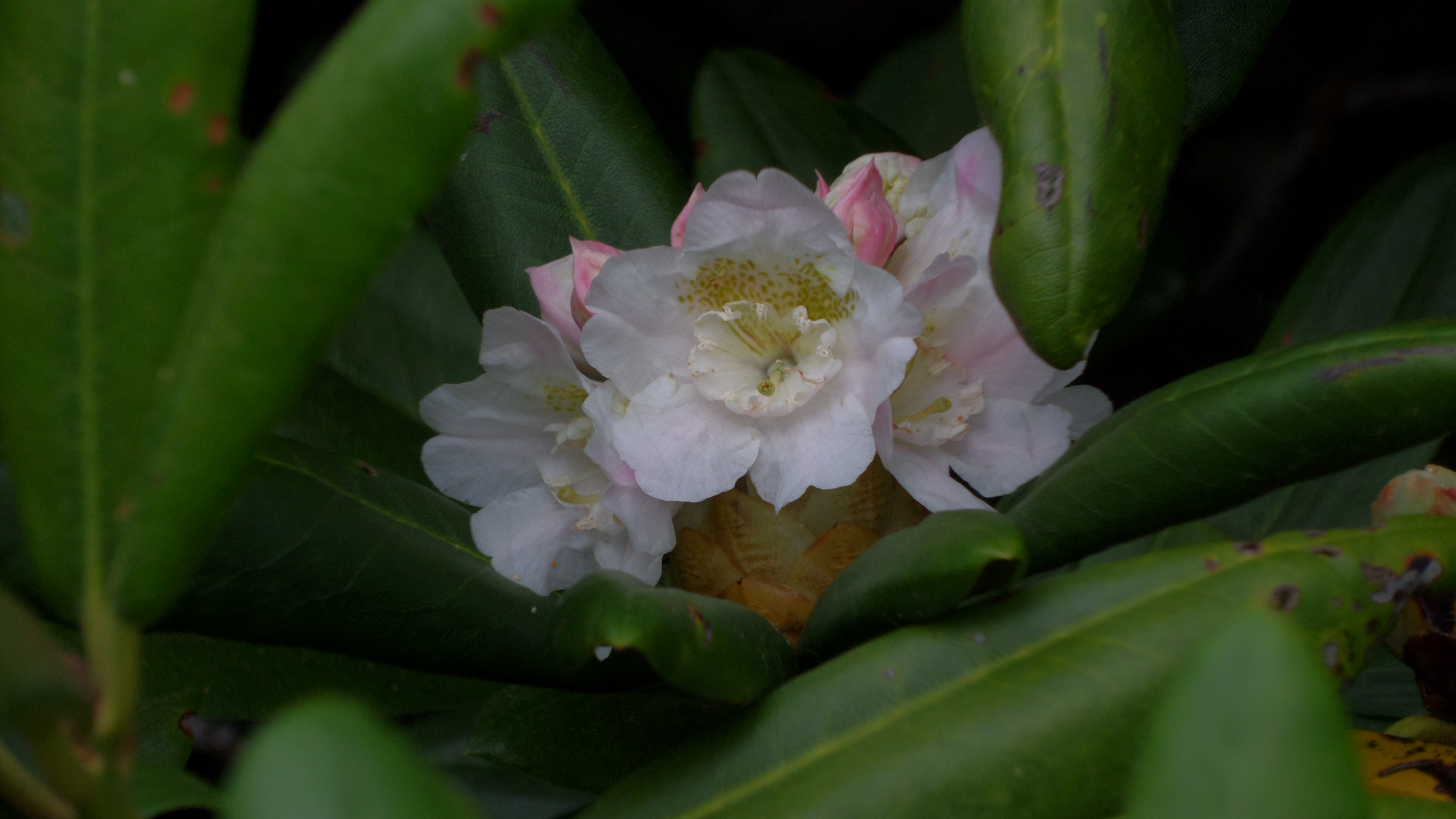
Close-up of the corolla

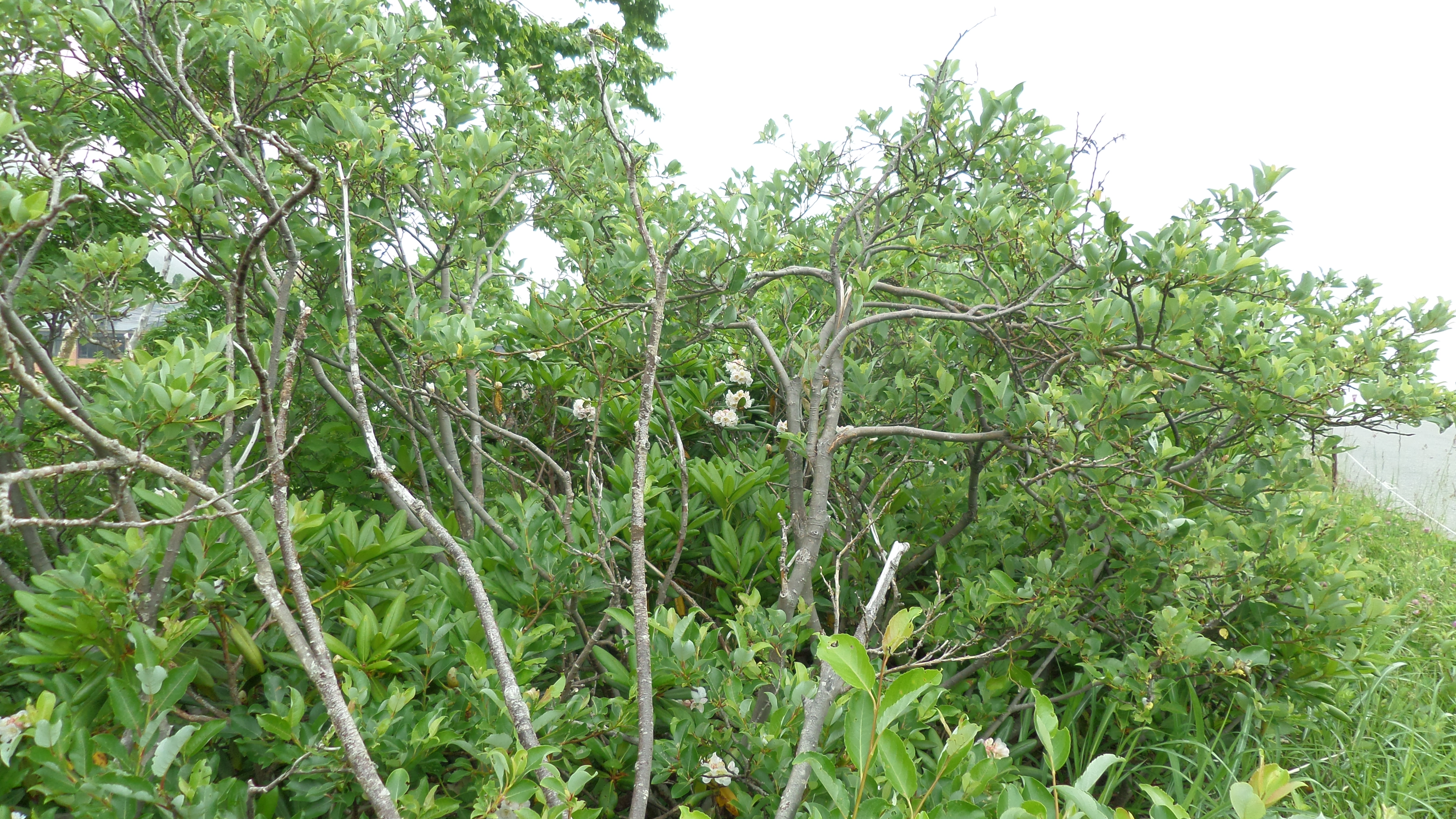
Habit and foliage
