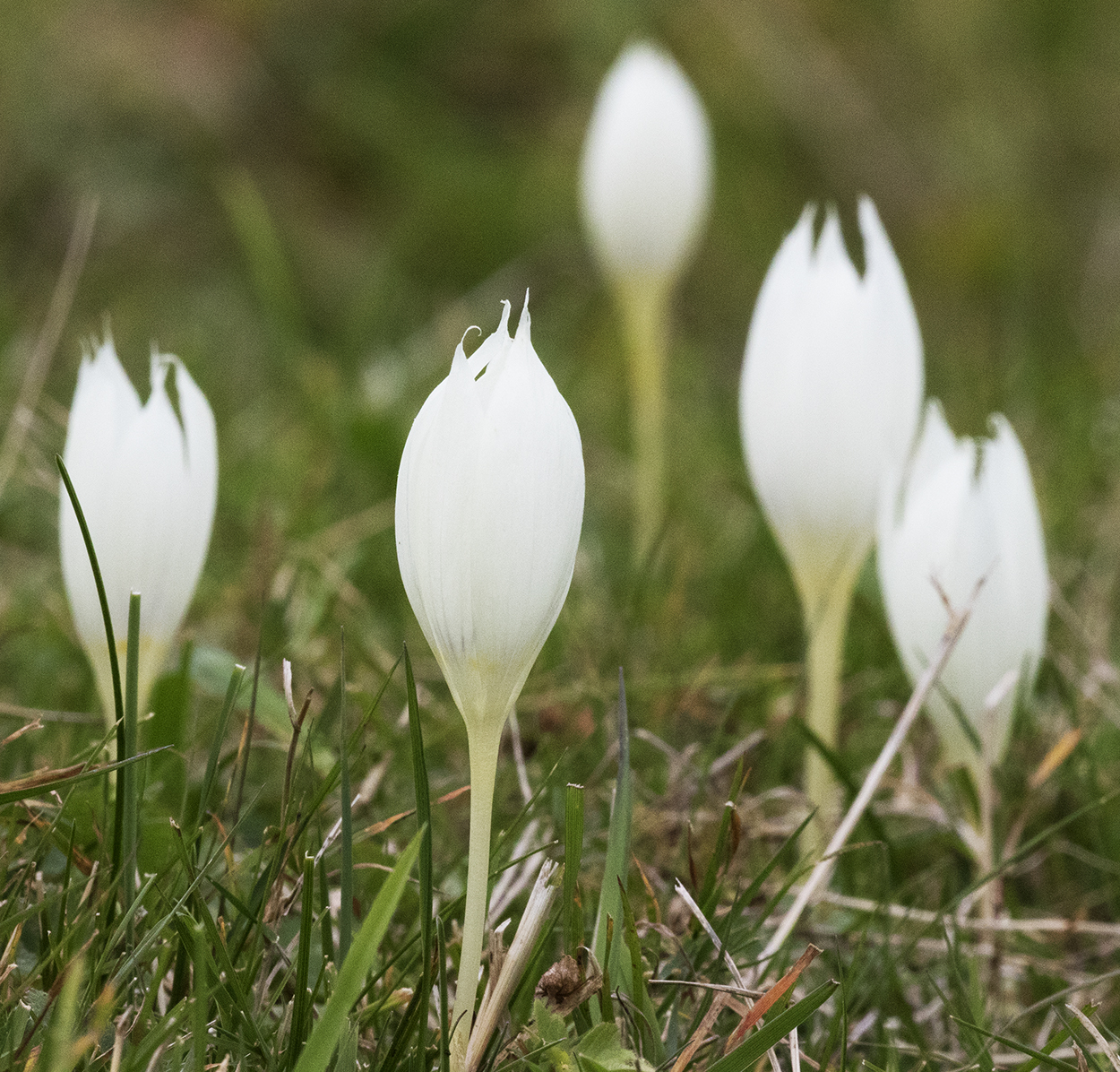
- In Trabzon Province, Turkey

Scientific classification
- Kingdom: Plantae
- Clade: Tracheophytes
- Clade: Angiosperms
- Clade: Monocots
- Order: Asparagales
- Family: Iridaceae
- Genus: Crocus
- Species: C. vallicola

Binomial name
- Crocus vallicola Herb.

= Crocus vallicola =

Species of flowering plant

Crocus vallicola is a species of flowering plant in the family Iridaceae. It is a cormous perennial native to north-eastern Turkey to the western Caucasus.
