= Aconitum palmatum =

Scientific classification
- Kingdom: Plantae
- Clade: Tracheophytes
- Clade: Angiosperms
- Clade: Eudicots
- Order: Ranunculales
- Family: Ranunculaceae
- Genus: Aconitum
- Species: A. palmatum

Binomial name
- Aconitum palmatum D.Don

Synonyms
- Aconitum bisma (Buch.-Ham.) Rapaics

Species of plant

Aconitum palmatum is a perennial, tuberous herb that predominantly occurs in temperate biomes. Its native range extends from the Himalayas to Tibet and Myanmar.
