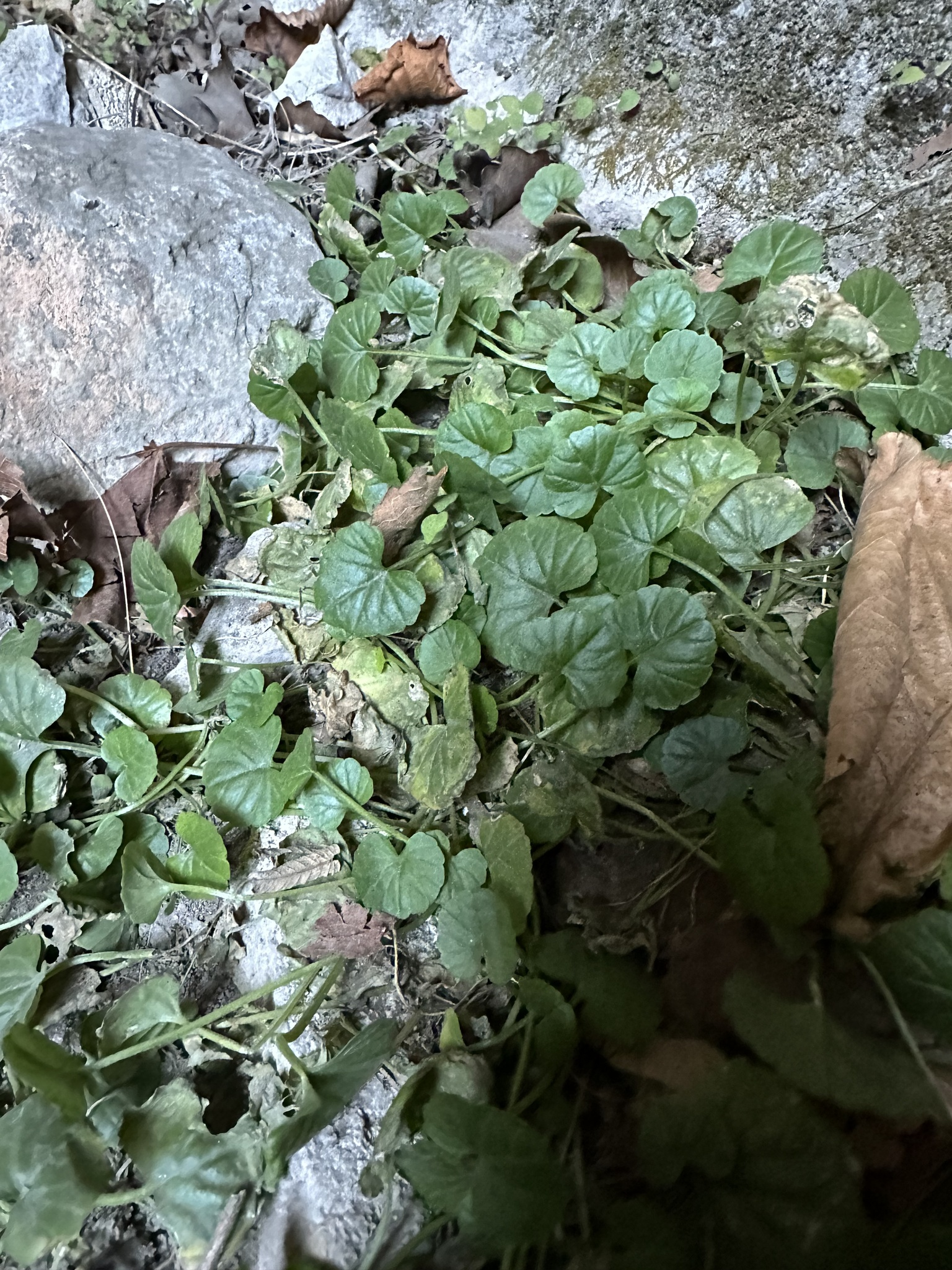
- Megadenia pygmaea in Primorsky Krai

Scientific classification
- Kingdom: Plantae
- Clade: Tracheophytes
- Clade: Angiosperms
- Clade: Eudicots
- Clade: Rosids
- Order: Brassicales
- Family: Brassicaceae
- Genus: Megadenia; Maxim.
- Species: M. pygmaea

Binomial name
- Megadenia pygmaea Maxim.

= Megadenia =

Genus of plants

Megadenia is a genus of flowering plants belonging to the family Brassicaceae. It includes a single species, Megadenia pygmaea, an annual native to subalpine areas of western and central China, Tibet, and the southern Russian Far East (Primorsky Krai). It is believed extinct in Buryatia.
