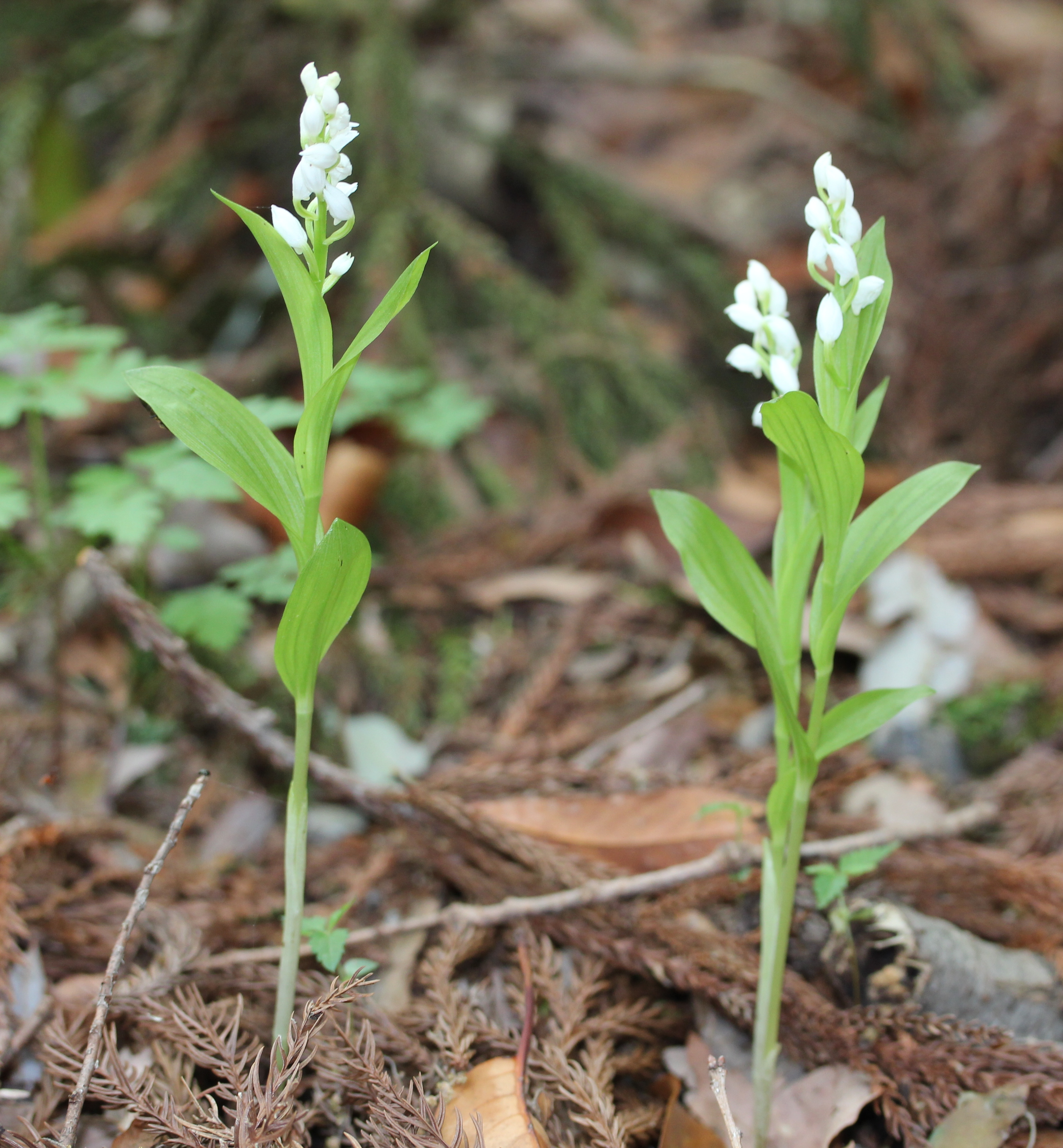
- Suzuka Mountains, Mie prefecture, Japan.

Scientific classification
- Kingdom: Plantae
- Clade: Embryophytes
- Clade: Tracheophytes
- Clade: Spermatophytes
- Clade: Angiosperms
- Clade: Monocots
- Order: Asparagales
- Family: Orchidaceae
- Subfamily: Epidendroideae
- Genus: Cephalanthera
- Species: C. erecta

Binomial name
- Cephalanthera erecta (Thunb.) Blume, 1859

Subspecies
- List: Cephalanthera erecta var. erecta; Cephalanthera erecta var. oblanceolata N. Pearce & P.J. Cribb, 2001; Cephalanthera erecta fo. subaphylla (Miyabe & Kudô) M. Hiroe, 1971

Synonyms
- Serapias erecta Thunb.; Cymbidium erectum (Thunb.) Sw., 1800; Epipactis erecta (Thunb.) Sw., 1805; Limodorum erectum (Thunb.) Kuntze, 1891; Cephalanthera nanlingensis A.Q.Hu & F.W.Xing, 2009; of C. erecta var. erecta: Cephalanthera elegans Schltr., 1919; Cephalanthera erecta var. szechuanica Schltr. ex H. Limpr., 1922; Cephalanthera szechuanica Schltr., 1924; Cephalanthera shizuoi F.Maek., 1936; Cephalanthera alpicola var. shizuoi (F.Maek.) T.Hashim., 1987; of C. erecta fo. subaphyla: Cephalanthera subaphylla Miyabe & Kudô, 1932

= Cephalanthera erecta =

Species of flowering plant

Cephalanthera erecta, the erect cephalanthera, is a species of terrestrial orchid. It is found in China, Japan, Korea, Kuril Islands, Bhutan, Assam and eastern Himalayas.

The tiny-leaved form subaphylla obtains most of its carbon via mycoheterotrophy. It is associated mainly with Thelephoraceae fungi.

== See also ==
- List of the vascular plants in the Red Data Book of Russia
