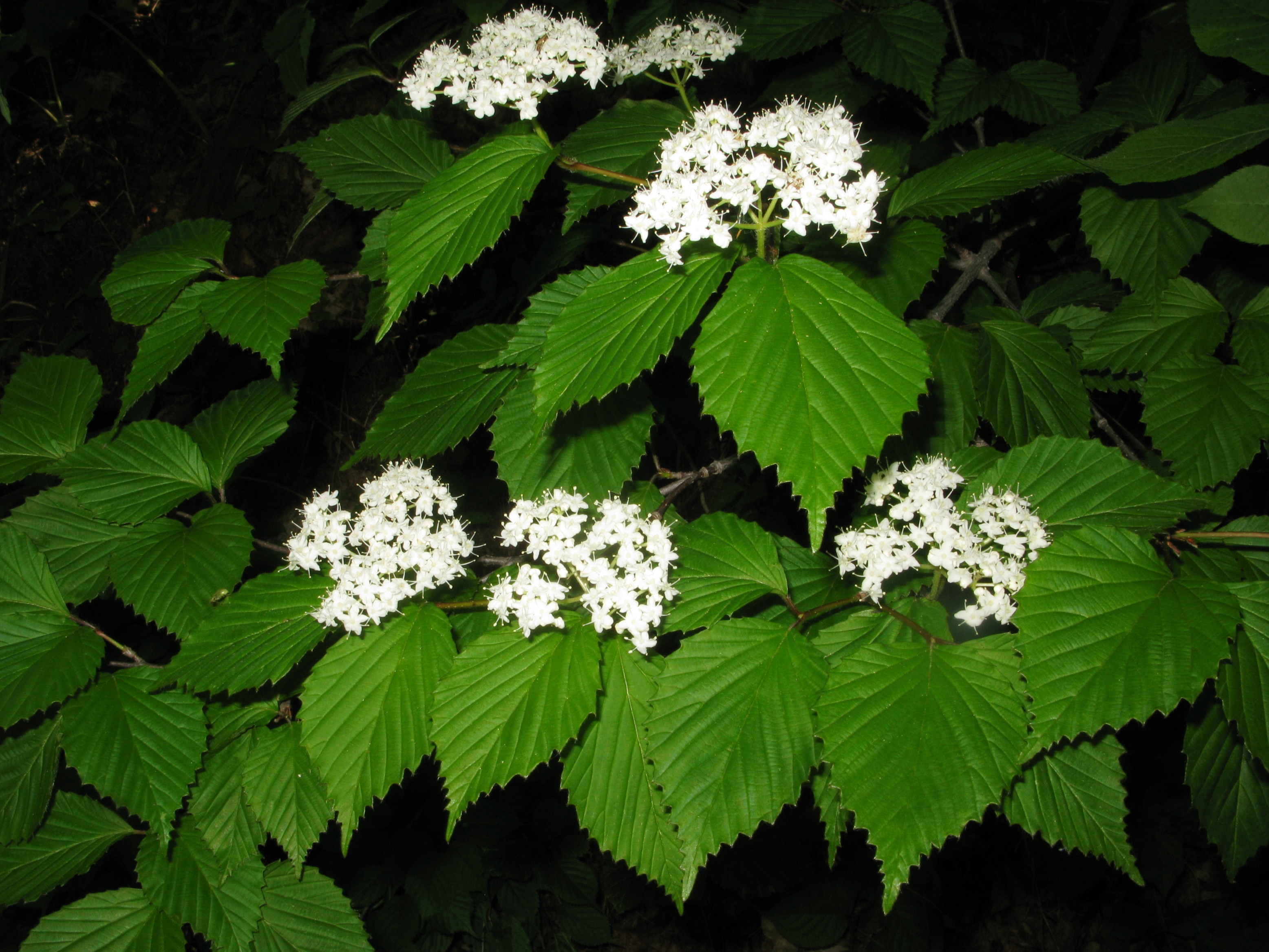

Scientific classification
- Kingdom: Plantae
- Clade: Tracheophytes
- Clade: Angiosperms
- Clade: Eudicots
- Clade: Asterids
- Order: Dipsacales
- Family: Viburnaceae
- Genus: Viburnum
- Species: V. wrightii

Binomial name
- Viburnum wrightii Miq.

Synonyms
- Viburnum hessei Koehne; Viburnum wrightii var. eglandulosum Nakai; Viburnum wrightii f. eglandulosum (Nakai) Hiyama; Viburnum wrightii var. hessei (Koehne) Rehder; Viburnum wrightii f. kaiense Hiyama; Viburnum wrightii var. lucidum Hatus.; Viburnum wrightii var. minus Nakai; Viburnum wrightii var. pilosum H.Hara; Viburnum wrightii var. stipellatum Nakai; Viburnum wrightii var. sylvestre Koidz.; Viburnum wrightii f. sylvestre (Koidz.) Hiyama

= Viburnum wrightii =

Species of flowering plant

Viburnum wrightii is a species of flowering plant in the family Viburnaceae. It is a shrub or tree with white flowers and red berries. The species is native to east Asia, and was described in 1866.

== Taxonomy ==
The species was described by Friedrich Anton Wilhelm Miquel in 1866.

== Distribution ==
Viburnum wrightii is native to the temperate biome of Japan, Korea, the Kuril Islands, and Russia (Sakhalin). It has been introduced to the United States (Massachusetts and Rhode Island).

== Description ==
Viburnum wrightii is a deciduous shrub or tree that grows 2.5–4 metres (8.2–13.1 ft) high. The leaves are oval-shaped, bright green, toothed, and have pointed ends. In autumn, the leaves turn red.

The flowers are white, and arranged into clusters with flat tops. The plant flowers in late spring.

The fruit is a bright red berry, and is potentially harmful if eaten. The plant fruits in autumn.

== Ecology ==
Viburnum wrightii is a host of Nothopucciniastrum miyabeanum, Erysiphe viburni, Armillaria mellea, and Phyllonorycter viburni.

== Nomenclature ==
In English, Viburnum wrightii is commonly known as "Wright's viburnum", or "leatherleaf." In Japanese, it is known as ミヤマガマズミ (miyamagamazumi). In Korean, it is known as 산가막살나무 (sangamagsalnamu). In Russian, it is known as Калина Райта (Kalina Rajta).
