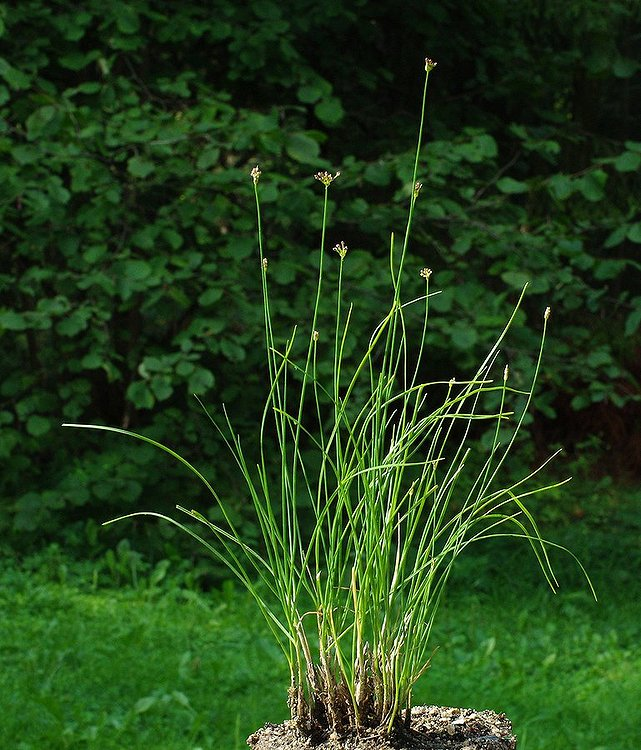

Scientific classification
- Kingdom: Plantae
- Clade: Tracheophytes
- Clade: Angiosperms
- Clade: Monocots
- Order: Asparagales
- Family: Amaryllidaceae
- Subfamily: Allioideae
- Genus: Allium
- Species: A. gunibicum

Binomial name
- Allium gunibicum Miscz. ex Grossh.

Synonyms
- Allium charadzeae Tscholok.; Allium chevsuricum Tscholok.; Allium salthynicum Tscholok.

= Allium gunibicum =

Species of flowering plant

Allium gunibicum is a species of flowering plant in the family Amaryllidaceae. It is native to the North Caucasus, and was described in 1928.

== Taxonomy ==
The name Allium gunibicum was first validly published by Alexander Alfonsovich Grossheim in 1928, following an earlier invalid publication by Pavel Ivanovich Misczenko.

== Distribution ==
Allium gunibicum is native to the temperate biome of the North Caucasus.

== Description ==
Allium gunibicum has underground storage organs.
