= Polygonum amgense =

Scientific classification
- Kingdom: Plantae
- Clade: Tracheophytes
- Clade: Angiosperms
- Clade: Eudicots
- Order: Caryophyllales
- Family: Polygonaceae
- Genus: Polygonum
- Species: P. amgense

Binomial name
- Polygonum amgense Michaleva & Perfiljeva

Synonyms
- Aconogonon amgense (Michaleva & Perfiljeva) Tzvelev; Pleuropteropyrum amgense (Michaleva & Perfiljeva) Soják

Species of flowering plants

Polygonum amgense is a species of flowering plant in the knotweed family that is native to East Siberia and to the Russian Far East.

Polygonum amgense is a tall herb with small yellow flowers, with a thin stem and flat leaves like its many milkweed relatives.
