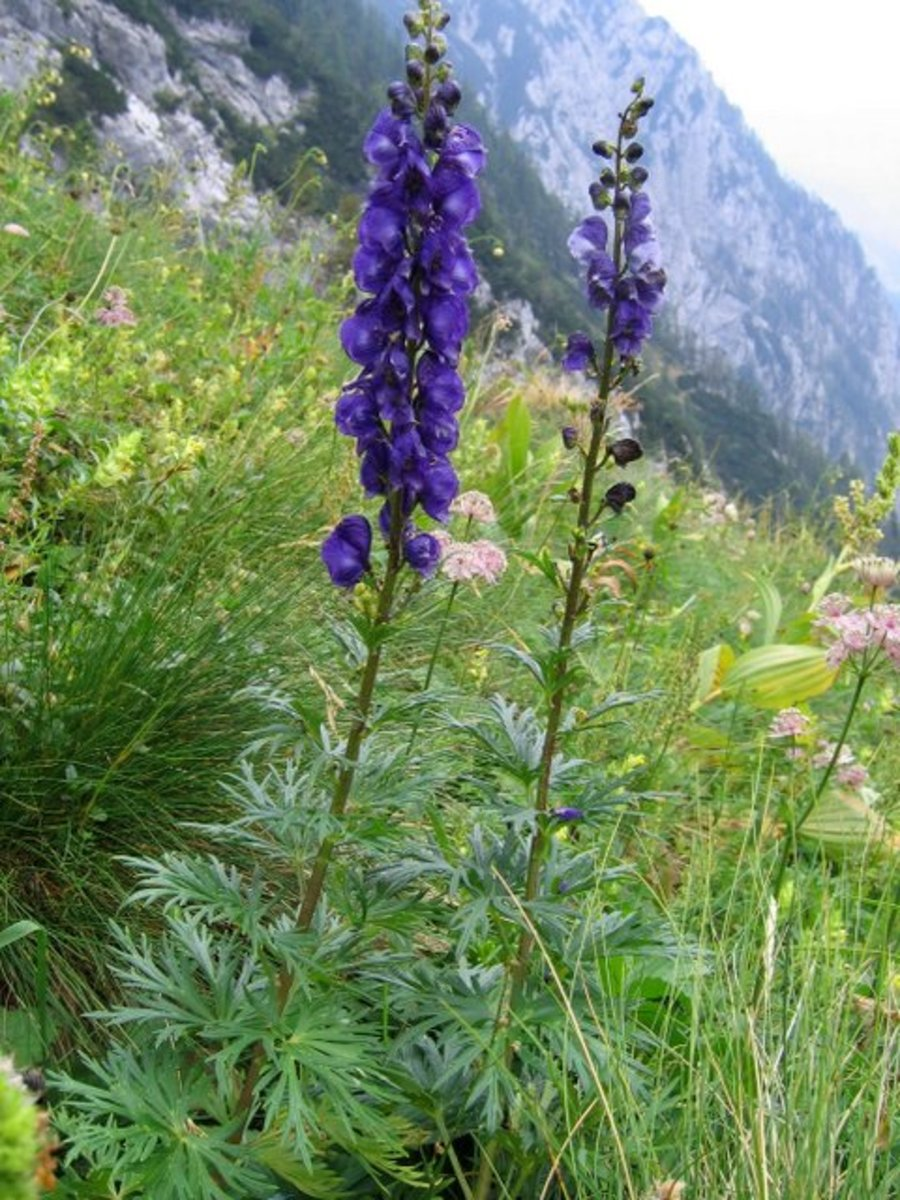

Scientific classification
- Kingdom: Plantae
- Clade: Tracheophytes
- Clade: Angiosperms
- Clade: Eudicots
- Order: Ranunculales
- Family: Ranunculaceae
- Genus: Aconitum
- Species: A. tauricum

Binomial name
- Aconitum tauricum Wulfen

Synonyms
- Aconitum autumnale Aconitum eustachium Aconitum formosum Aconitum koelleanum Aconitum latemarense Aconitum multifidum Aconitum napellus subsp. formosum Aconitum napellus subsp. neomontanum Aconitum napellus subsp. koelleanum Aconitum napellus f. taurericum Aconitum napellus subsp. tauricum Aconitum taurericum Aconitum tauricum subsp. latemarense

= Aconitum tauricum =

Species of plant

Aconitum tauricum is a species of flowering plant in the buttercup family. Some sources declare it as a subspecies of Aconitum napellus under the name Aconitum napellus subsp. tauricum.

== Distribution ==
This wildflower is native to Europe (Austria, Germany, Romania, Ukraine, Yugoslavia). where it grows in alpine and subalpine areas. Inhabited biotops include meadows and tall herbaceous vegetation.

== Description ==
Aconitum tauricum is a tall spindly erect to scandent forb which is perennial from rhizomes. Rhizomes are not globose. It has divided leaves with faintly visible net-like leaf veins on the underside (stem leafes). The flowering period extends primarily from August to October. The inflorescence is paniculate and simple or branched with a few side risps.

The perigon is blue or purple. The helmet is usually wider than high. The tepals are bare on the outside. The flower stems have upright gland hairs, are bare or possess only underneath the flower protruding glandular hairs. The linear bracteoles are bald or hairy and measure 3 to 7, rarely 2 mm. The nectar leaves may be bald or hairy.

The plant reaches a stature height of about 0,8 m. The pollination is done by insects (Bombus spec. and others). The fruits are pod-like follicles, ripe seeds are black. Aconitum tauricum is poisonous due to the presence of alkaloids like aconitine.
