= Aconitum assamicum =

Scientific classification
- Kingdom: Plantae
- Clade: Tracheophytes
- Clade: Angiosperms
- Clade: Eudicots
- Order: Ranunculales
- Family: Ranunculaceae
- Genus: Aconitum
- Species: A. assamicum

Binomial name
- Aconitum assamicum Lauener

Species of plant

Aconitum assamicum is a species of flowering plant. This species was first described in 1963 by Lauener. It is a biennial herb native to Arunachal Pradesh in northeastern India, where it grows in temperate biomes.

== Description ==
Stems simple, erect, up to 60 cm tall, covered with long, spreading golden hairs, leaves are kidney shaped, flowers pale yellow; sepals with long hairs; petals without hairs.
