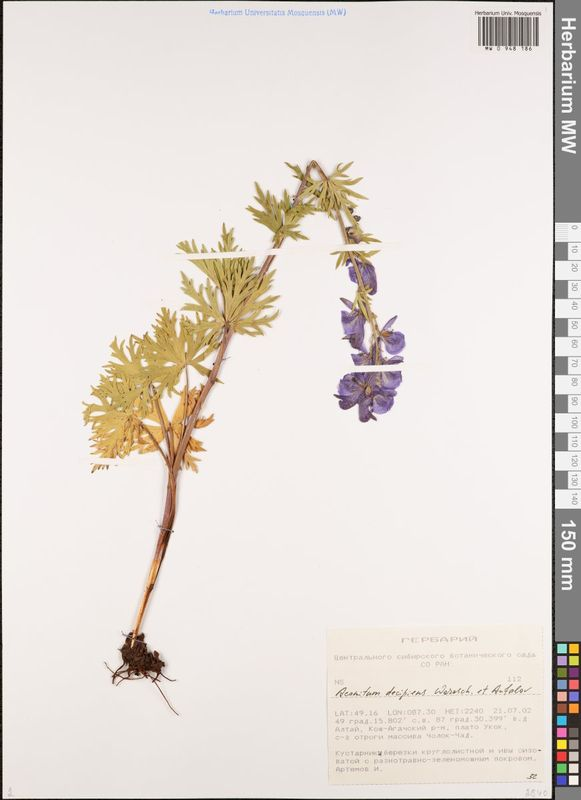

Scientific classification
- Kingdom: Plantae
- Clade: Embryophytes
- Clade: Tracheophytes
- Clade: Angiosperms
- Clade: Eudicots
- Order: Ranunculales
- Family: Ranunculaceae
- Genus: Aconitum
- Species: A. decipiens

Binomial name
- Aconitum decipiens Vorosch. & Anfalov

Synonyms
- Aconitum curvirostre (Krylov) Serg.; Aconitum napellus var. curverostre Krylov

= Aconitum decipiens =

Species of flowering plant

Aconitum decipiens is a species of flowering plant in the family Ranunculaceae. It is native to Russia and Mongolia, and was described in 1943.

== Taxonomy ==
The species was described by Vladimir Nikolaevich Voroschilov and P.A. Anfalov in 1943.

== Distribution ==
The species is native to the temperate biome of Russia (Altai Republic and Tuva) and Mongolia.

== Description ==
Aconitum decipiens is a perennial or has underground tubers.

== Nomenclature ==
In Russian, the species is known as Борец обманчивый (Borec obmancivyj).
