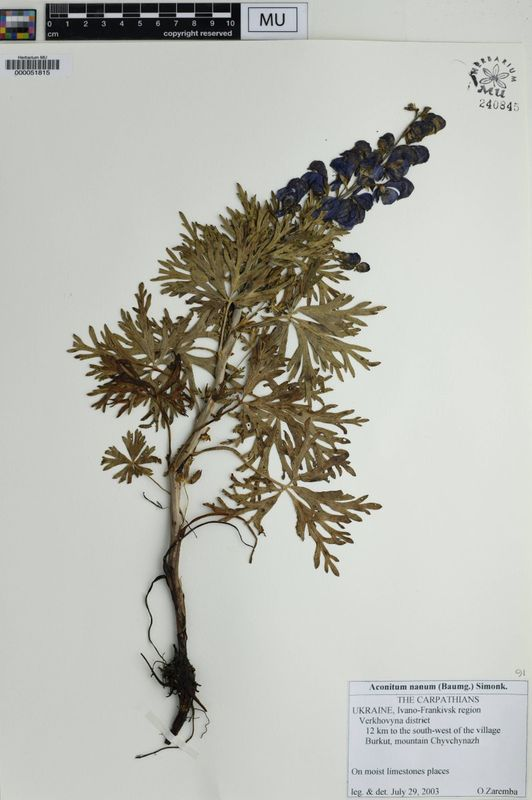

Scientific classification
- Kingdom: Plantae
- Clade: Embryophytes
- Clade: Tracheophytes
- Clade: Angiosperms
- Clade: Eudicots
- Order: Ranunculales
- Family: Ranunculaceae
- Genus: Aconitum
- Species: A. biflorum

Binomial name
- Aconitum biflorum Fisch. ex DC.

Synonyms
- Aconitum biflorum var. pluriflorum Regel; Aconitum grandiflorum Fisch.; Aconitum nanum Stephan ex Ledeb.

= Aconitum biflorum =

Species of flowering plant

Aconitum biflorum is a species of flowering plant in the family Ranunculaceae. It is native to Russia and Mongolia, and was described in 1817.

== Taxonomy ==
The species was first validly published by Augustin Pyramus de Candolle in 1817, following an earlier invalid publication by Friedrich Ernst Ludwig von Fischer.

== Distribution ==
Aconitum biflorum is native to the temperate biome of Russia (Altay, Krasnoyarsk, Tuva, West Siberia) and Mongolia.

== Description ==
Aconitum biflorum is a perennial, or has underground tubers.

== Nomenclature ==
In Russian, the species is known as Аконит двуцветковый (Akonit dvucvetkovyj).
