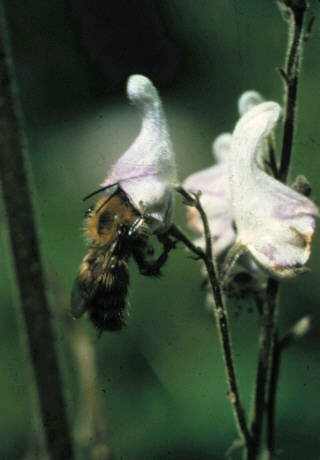

Scientific classification
- Kingdom: Animalia
- Phylum: Arthropoda
- Class: Insecta
- Order: Hymenoptera
- Family: Apidae
- Genus: Bombus
- Subgenus: Bombus (Megabombus)
- Species: B. consobrinus

Binomial name
- Bombus consobrinus Dahlbom, 1832

= Bombus consobrinus =

Species of bee

Bombus consobrinus is a species of bumblebee found in northern Europe, Siberia, Kamchatka, Mongolia, Northeast China, Korea, and Japan. It is associated with taiga.

== Description ==
The bumblebee is large, with the thorax and anterior part of the abdomen coloured orange, followed by a black band. The tip of the abdomen is grey.

== Behaviour ==
This bumblebee, like Bombus (Megabombus) gerstaeckeri, feeds almost entirely on the flowers of monkshood (Aconitum). However, this tight relationship holds only in northern Europe (with Aconitum septentrionale); further east it can be found in areas without Aconitum.
