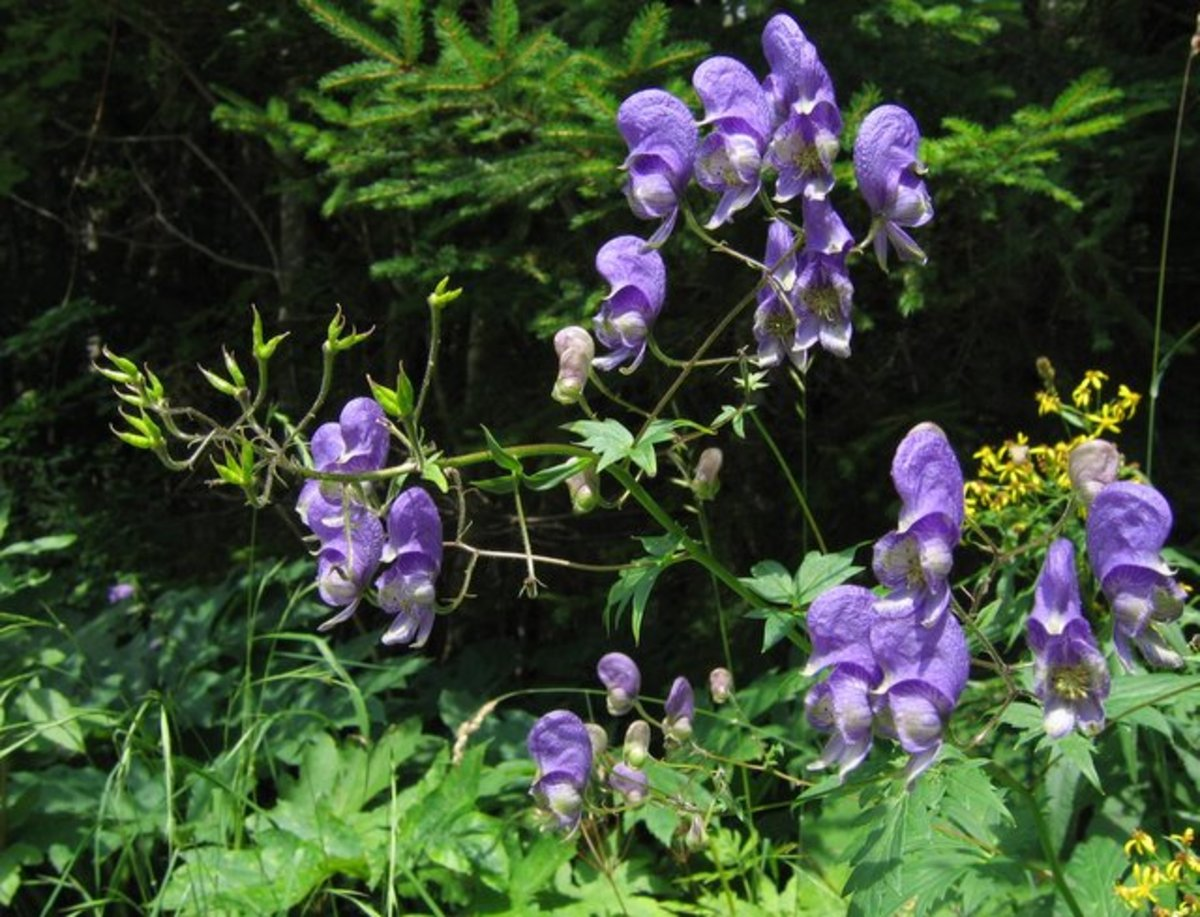
- Aconitum degenii, inflorescence

Scientific classification
- Kingdom: Plantae
- Clade: Tracheophytes
- Clade: Angiosperms
- Clade: Eudicots
- Order: Ranunculales
- Family: Ranunculaceae
- Genus: Aconitum
- Species: A. degenii

Binomial name
- Aconitum degenii Gáyer

Synonyms
- Aconitum camarum Aconitum cernuum Aconitum flexicaule Aconitum humile Aconitum molle Aconitum neomontanum Aconitum paniculatum Aconitum parviflorum Aconitum prutense Aconitum reflexum Aconitum wilemetianum

= Aconitum degenii =

Species of plant

Aconitum degenii is a species of flowering plant in the buttercup family known by the common name branched monkshood .

== Distribution ==
This wildflower is native to Europe (south, south-east) where it grows in subalpine areas. Inhabited biotops include tall herbaceous vegetation and deciduous forests.

== Description ==
Aconitum degenii is a tall spindly erect to scandent forb which is perennial from rhizomes. It has divided leaves. The flowering period extends primarily from July to September. The inflorescence is paniculate and branched. The perigon is blue or purple. The helmet is about as high as it is wide or less high. The nectar leaves have a curved stem. The spur is slightly bent back. The plant reaches a stature height between 0.5 and 2.5 m. The pollination is done by insects (Bombus spec. and others). The fruits are pod-like follicles. Aconitum degenii is poisonous due to the presence of alkaloids like aconitine.

=== Subspecies ===
Currently 2 subspecies are accepted:

- Aconitum degenii subsp. paniculatum (Arcang.) Mucher
- Aconitum degenii subsp. valesiacum (Gáyer) Mucher
