= Aconitum bucovinense =

Scientific classification
- Kingdom: Plantae
- Clade: Embryophytes
- Clade: Tracheophytes
- Clade: Spermatophytes
- Clade: Angiosperms
- Clade: Eudicots
- Order: Ranunculales
- Family: Ranunculaceae
- Genus: Aconitum
- Species: A. bucovinense

Binomial name
- Aconitum bucovinense Zapal.

Species of flowering plant

Aconitum bucovinense is a species of monkshood in the buttercup family Ranunculaceae, native to the Carpathians. Although itself rare, it is a parent of Aconitum × nanum with Aconitum firmum.
