= Aconitum flavum =

Scientific classification
- Kingdom: Plantae
- Clade: Tracheophytes
- Clade: Angiosperms
- Clade: Eudicots
- Order: Ranunculales
- Family: Ranunculaceae
- Genus: Aconitum
- Species: A. flavum

Binomial name
- Aconitum flavum Hand.-Mazz.

Species of flowering plant

Aconitum flavum ( 伏毛鐵棒鎚, Chinese interpretation : Fluff iron hammer ) is a species of flowering plant in the genus Aconitum of the family Ranunculaceae, native and endemic to northwestern Sichuan, northern Tibet, Qinghai, Gansu, southern Ningxia and southern Inner Mongolia.

It grows at a grassy slope or sparse forest at an altitude of 2000–3700 meters.

== Ethnobotanical medicinal value ==
Roots are used for rheumatoid arthritis, joint pain or partial muscle soreness and numbness, chronic pain after bone fracture, recurrent tinea, favus, persistent pain of bruises.

Roots can eliminate drunkenness, opium poisoning, traumatic bleeding, rheumatism, bone pain, etc.

=== Used for ethnic group and medicine name ===
- Bai people, medicine name【白藥 : 嘿德】
- Lis people, medicine, name【僳僳藥 : 垛箭】
- Nakhi people, medicine name【纳西藥 : 堵那】
- Yi people, medicine name【彝藥 : 都拉】

== Phytochemical ==
- Aconitine
- napelline
- 3-Acetylaconitine
- flavaconitine
- 3-deoxyaconitine
- dehydronapelline
- 1-epinapelline
- 12-epinapelline
- 12-acetyllucidusculine
- 1-demethylhypaconitine
- lucidusculine
- benzoylaconine
- neoline
- flavadine
- flavamine
- flavaconidine
- N-acetylflavaconitine
- flavaconijine
