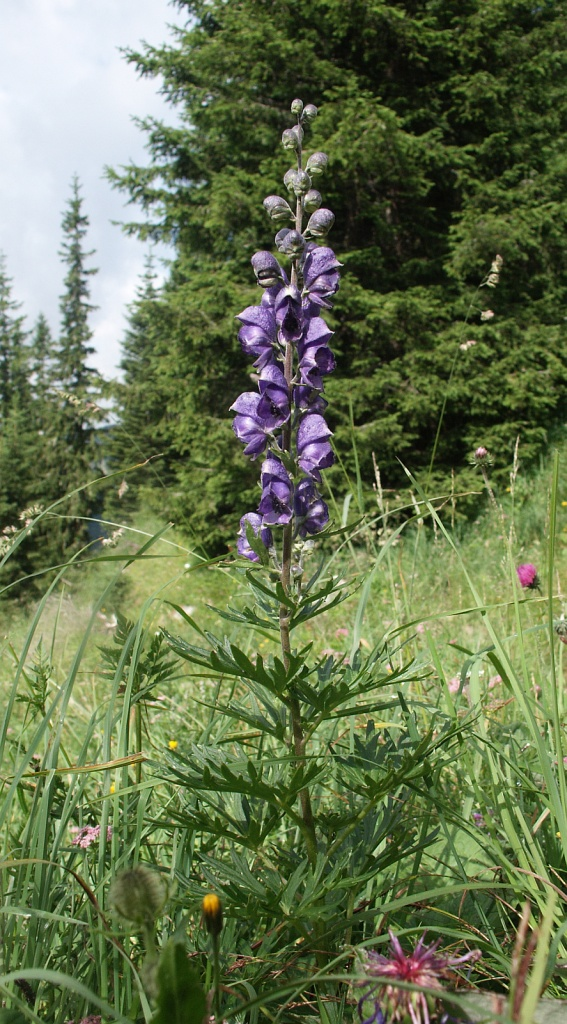

Conservation status
- Least Concern (IUCN 3.1)

Scientific classification
- Kingdom: Plantae
- Clade: Tracheophytes
- Clade: Angiosperms
- Clade: Eudicots
- Order: Ranunculales
- Family: Ranunculaceae
- Genus: Aconitum
- Species: A. napellus

Binomial name
- Aconitum napellus L.

= Aconitum napellus =

Species of plant

Aconitum napellus, monkshood, aconite, Venus' chariot or wolfsbane, is a species of highly toxic flowering plants in the genus Aconitum of the family Ranunculaceae, native and endemic to western and central Europe. A perennial plant, it is herbaceous and grows to 1 m (3 ft 3 in) tall, with hairless stems and leaves. The leaves are rounded, 5–10 cm (2.0–3.9 in) diameter, palmately divided into five to seven deeply lobed segments. The flowers are dark purple to bluish-purple, narrow oblong helmet-shaped, 1–2 cm (0.39–0.79 in) tall. Plants native to Asia and North America formerly listed as A. napellus are now regarded as separate species. The plant is extremely poisonous in both ingestion and body contact. It is the most poisonous plant in all of Europe.

== Cultivation ==
Aconitum napellus is grown in gardens in temperate zones for its spiky inflorescences that are showy in mid-autumn, and its attractive foliage. There are white and rose colored forms in cultivation too. The cultivar 'Spark's Variety' has gained the Royal Horticultural Society's Award of Garden Merit.

== Subspecies ==
Nine subspecies are accepted by the Flora Europaea:

- Aconitum napellus subsp. napellus, south-western Britain
- Aconitum napellus subsp. corsicum (Gáyer) W.Seitz, Corsica
- Aconitum napellus subsp. firmum (Rchb.) Gáyer, Central and eastern Europe (declared as an own species Aconitum firmum)
- Aconitum napellus subsp. fissurae (Nyár.) W.Seitz, Balkans to south-western Russia
- Aconitum napellus subsp. hians (Rchb.) Gáyer, Central Europe
- Aconitum napellus subsp. lusitanicum Rouy, south-western Europe
- Aconitum napellus subsp. superbum (Fritsch) W.Seitz, western Balkans
- Aconitum napellus subsp. tauricum (Wulfen) Gáyer, Eastern Alps, southern Carpathians (declared as an own species Aconitum tauricum by other sources)
- Aconitum napellus subsp. vulgare (DC.) Rouy & Foucaud, Alps, Pyrenees, northern Spain

== Uses ==
Aconitum napellus is grown in gardens for its attractive spike-like inflorescences and showy blue flowers. It is a cut flower crop used for fresh cutting material and sometimes used as dried material. The species has a low natural propagation rate under cultivation and is propagated by seed or by removing offsets that are generated each year from the rootstocks. The use of micropropagation protocols has been studied. This species has been crossed with other Aconitums to produce attractive hybrids for garden use, including Aconitum × cammarum.

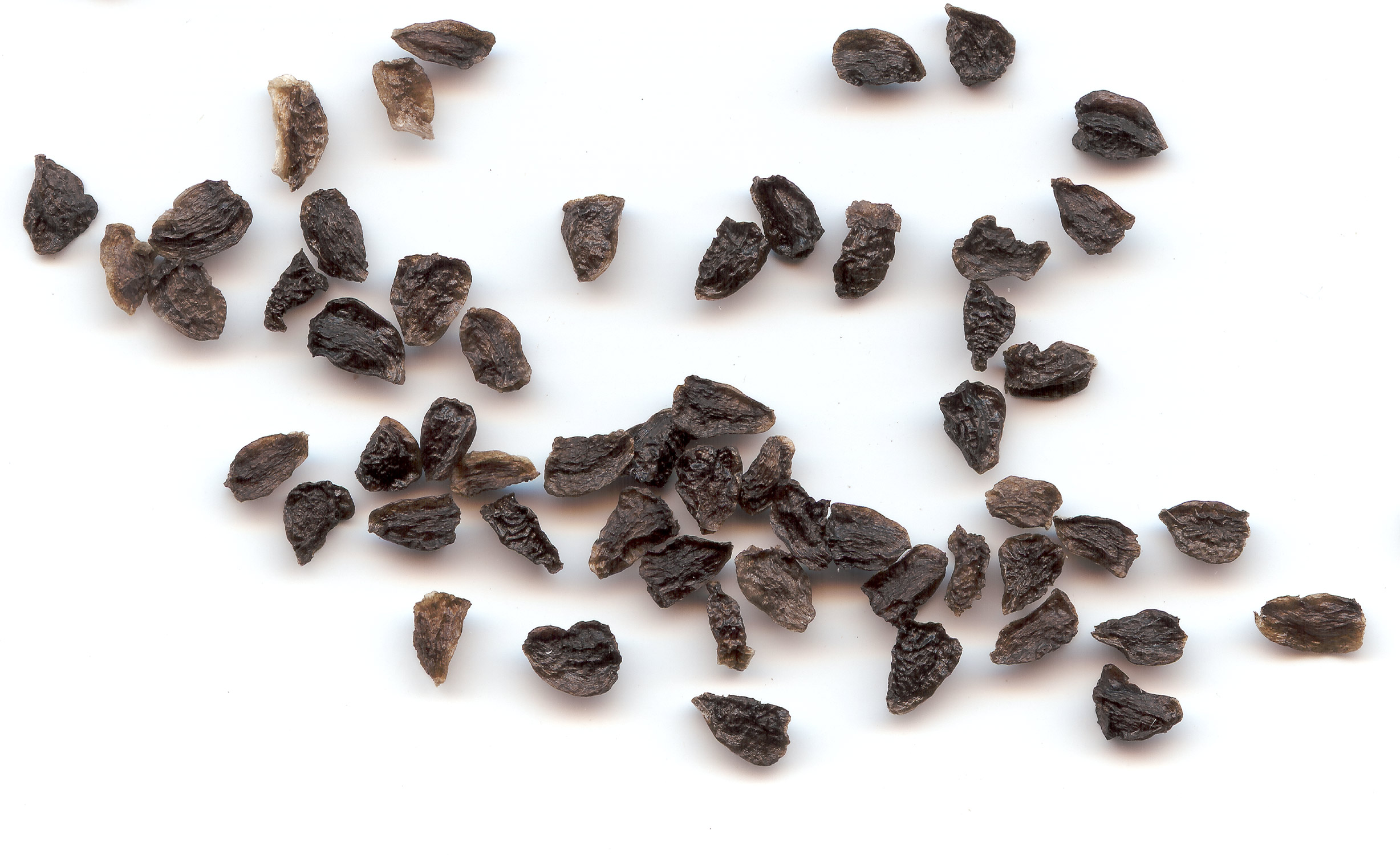
Seeds

Like other species in the genus, A. napellus contains several poisonous compounds, including enough cardiac poison that it was used on spears and arrows for hunting and battle in ancient times. Persian physician Avicenna (980–1037) wrote that arrows dipped in the sap were used to kill, and Dr Antonio Guaineri, in one of the first medical dictionaries 'Practica', wrote that arrows that had the poison from roots of the plant were used to kill wild goats in Italy. A. napellus has a long history of use as a poison, with cases going back thousands of years. During the ancient Roman period of European history, the plant was often used to eliminate criminals and enemies, and by the end of the period it was banned and anyone growing A. napellus could have been legally sentenced to death. Aconites have been used more recently in murder plots; they contain the chemical alkaloids aconitine, mesaconitine, hypaconitine and jesaconitine, which are highly toxic. It was also used in a recent Sherlock Holmes book plot.

== History ==
=== History of Medicinal Use ===
The broader Aconitum genus has a long history of medicinal use in China, though classical Chinese sources do not distinguish between species in terms recognizable to modern botany. Known commonly as fùzǐ (附子), aconite was one of the most frequently prescribed drugs in classical Chinese pharmacies. The earliest evidence of its medicinal use comes from a collection of formulas excavated from Mawangdui in southern China (168 BCE), where aconite appears as the second most-used substance among over two hundred drugs. It was typically applied externally to treat wounds and taken internally as a tonic to replenish Qì.

Chinese physicians classified drugs according to the concept of dú (毒), which was indicative of potency rather than poison in the modern sense. The sixth-century pharmacologist Tao Hongjing described fùzǐ as "the lord of the hundred drugs" (百藥之長) in his Collected Annotations on the Divine Farmer's Classic of Materia Medica. Because aconite possessed great dú, careful preparation was essential. Practitioners used a variety of techniques including prolonged boiling, soaking, and roasting to reduce its lethality while keeping it viable for therapeutic use. In contrast, Dioscorides' De Materia Medica describes aconite only as a poison used to kill wolves, with no curative value attributed to it.

=== Renaissance Poison Trials ===
Renaissance physicians categorized Aconitum napellus as one of the most toxic substances available at the time. In Galenic medical theory, most drugs were difficult to evaluate because their effects varied depending on an individual's humoral complexion. Poisons, however, were understood to harm universally through what physicians called "total substance" which made them and their antidotes comparatively straightforward to test. This concept, also known as "specific form", illustrated that poisons acted through an occult, or a hidden virtue of the substance as a whole, that attacked the body's vital functions rather than through the humoral qualities of hot, cold, wet, and dry that governed most drugs.

In 1524, Pope Clement VII ordered his physicians to test an antidote known as Caravita's oil on two condemned Corsican prisoners named Gianfrancesco and Ambrogio. Both were given marzipan cakes containing aconite from the Apennine Mountains. Caravita applied the oil to Gianfrancesco, who survived; Ambrogio received no antidote and died after four hours. A Latin pamphlet announcing the results was published shortly afterward, signed by the papal physician Paolo Giovio, papal pharmacist Tomasso Bigliotti, and Roman senator Pietro Borghese.

In December 1561, a group of physicians gathered at Prague Castle to conduct a similar test on a soldier condemned to hanging for thievery. The prisoner was given approximately four grams of powdered A. napellus root mixed with rose sugar, followed by an antidote powder created by Archduke Ferdinand II of Tyrol. The antidote failed and the prisoner died. The Italian physician Pietro Andrea Mattioli, who led the proceedings and had studied under Caravita decades earlier, documented the trial in revised editions of his Commentaries on Dioscorides from 1563 onward, emphasizing A. napellus's extreme toxicity.

== Toxicology ==
Marked symptoms may appear almost immediately, usually not later than one hour, and "with large doses, death is almost instantaneous". Death usually occurs within two to six hours in fatal poisoning (20 to 40 mL of tincture may prove fatal). The initial signs are gastrointestinal including nausea, vomiting, and diarrhea. This is followed by a sensation of burning, tingling, and numbness in the mouth and face, and of burning in the abdomen. In severe poisonings pronounced motor weakness occurs and cutaneous sensations of tingling and numbness spread to the limbs. Cardiovascular features include hypotension, sinus bradycardia, and ventricular arrhythmias. Other features may include sweating, dizziness, difficulty in breathing, headache, and confusion. The main causes of death are ventricular arrhythmias and asystole, paralysis of the heart or of the respiratory center. The only post-mortem signs are those of asphyxia.

Treatment of poisoning is mainly supportive. All patients require close monitoring of blood pressure and cardiac rhythm. Gastrointestinal decontamination with activated charcoal can be used if given within one hour of ingestion. The major physiological antidote is atropine, which is used to treat bradycardia. Other drugs used for ventricular arrhythmia include lidocaine, amiodarone, bretylium, flecainide, procainamide, and mexiletine. Cardiopulmonary bypass is used if symptoms are refractory to treatment with these drugs. Successful use of charcoal hemoperfusion has been claimed in patients with severe aconite poisoning.

Poisoning may also occur following picking the leaves without wearing gloves; the aconitine toxin is absorbed easily through the skin. In this event, there will be no gastrointestinal effects. Tingling will start at the point of absorption and extend up the arm to the shoulder, after which the heart will start to be affected. The tingling will be followed by unpleasant numbness. Treatment is similar to poisoning caused by oral ingestion and even handling the plant without gloves has been reported to result in multi-organ failure and death.

The plant's chief toxic component, aconitine, is a potent neurotoxin that opens tetrodotoxin sensitive sodium channels. It increases the influx of sodium through these channels and delays repolarization, thus increasing excitability and promoting ventricular dysrhythmias.
