= Gyula Gáyer =

Hungarian botanist (1883–1932)

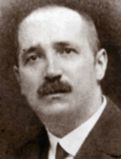
- Born: 16 February 1883; Kiscell, Hungary, Austria-Hungary
- Died: 13 June 1932 (aged 49); Szombathely, Hungary
- Occupation(s): botanist, lawyer, judge

Gyula Gáyer (16 February 1883, in Kiscell, Hungary, Austria-Hungary – 13 June 1932, in Szombathely, Hungary) was a Hungarian botanist, lawyer, and judge.

His early education was at Celldömölk. At the age of ten, Gáyer came to Szombathely, where he became a pupil of the Premonstratensian grammar school. He finished high school in Budapest. From 1904, he continued his studies at the university in Cluj-Napoca, where he was called to the bar in 1907. From 1914 onward he was a judge.

== Botanical work ==
He described several species and subspecies, including several subspecies of Aconitum napellus.

Several plants bear his name:

- (Euphorbiaceae) Tithymalus × gayeri (Boros & Soó) Holub
- (Rhamnaceae) Rhamnus × gayeri Kárpáti ex Soó
