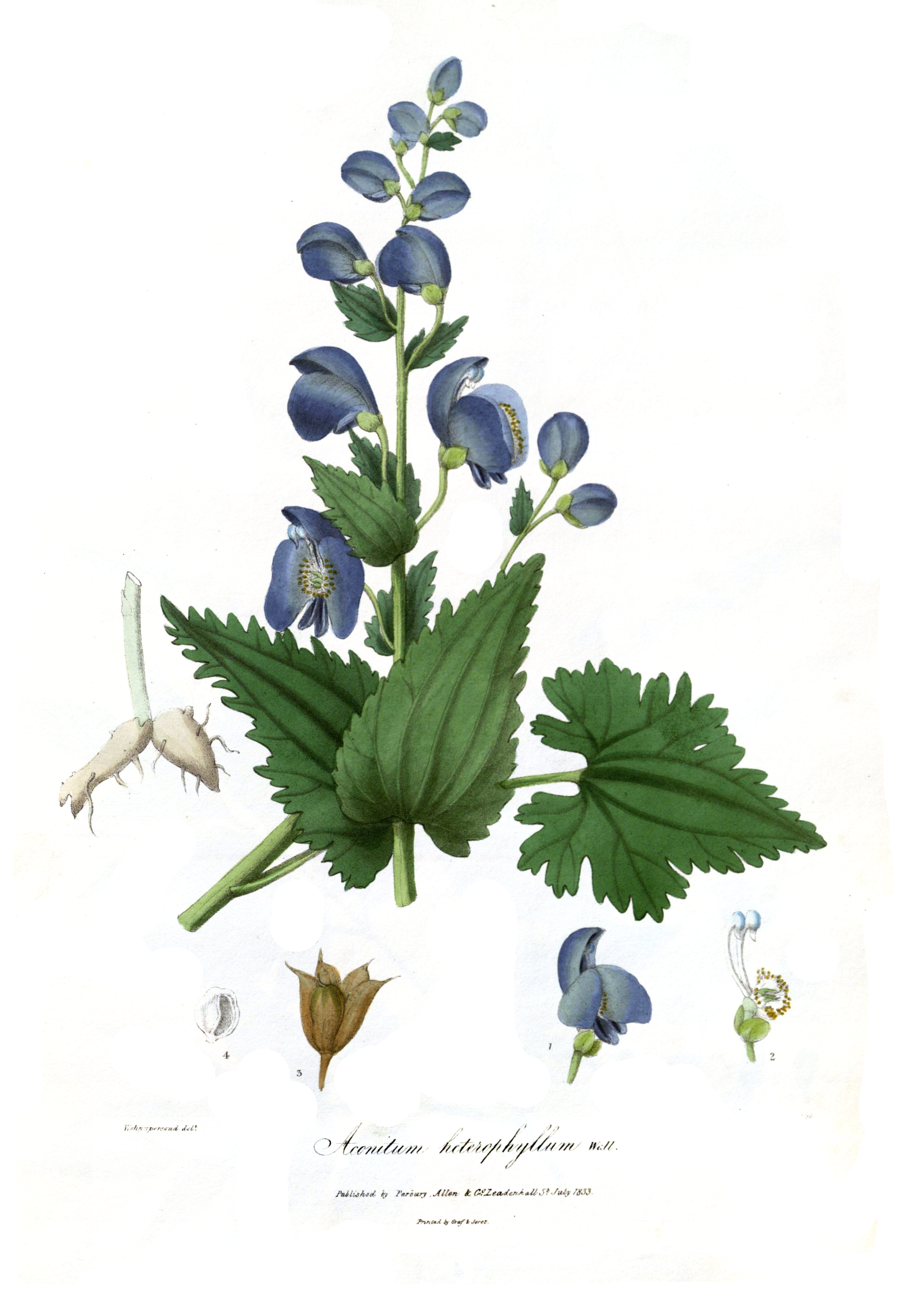

Conservation status
- Endangered (IUCN 3.1)

Scientific classification
- Kingdom: Plantae
- Clade: Tracheophytes
- Clade: Angiosperms
- Clade: Eudicots
- Order: Ranunculales
- Family: Ranunculaceae
- Genus: Aconitum
- Species: A. heterophyllum

Binomial name
- Aconitum heterophyllum Wall. ex Royle 1834

Synonyms
- Aconitum heterophyllum Wallich

= Aconitum heterophyllum =

Species of flowering plant

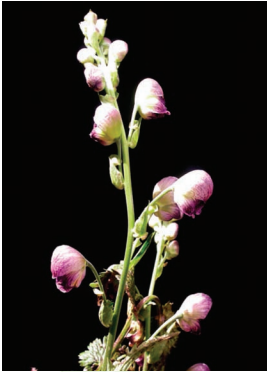
Aconitum heterophyllum

Aconitum heterophyllum, also called atish/atis/patis/ativish/atvika, is a species of flowering plant in the genus Aconitum. It is used in Indian systems of traditional medicine including Ayurveda and called विषा or अतिविषा (IAST: viṣā, ativiṣā) in Sanskrit.

Available in the slopes in sub alpine and alpine areas between 2500- 3500m. Jammu & Kashmir, Himachal Pradesh and Uttarakhand. Pakistan and Nepal.

Medicinal Use : Roots are used to cure dysentery, diarrhea, fever, malarial fever, cough, cold colic, headache, piles, hysteria, throat infection, cure for dyspepsia, especially when appetite is lost after illness and also in vomiting, abdominal pain and diabetes. It also checks excessive menstrual flow. Fresh leaves used to cure toothache.
