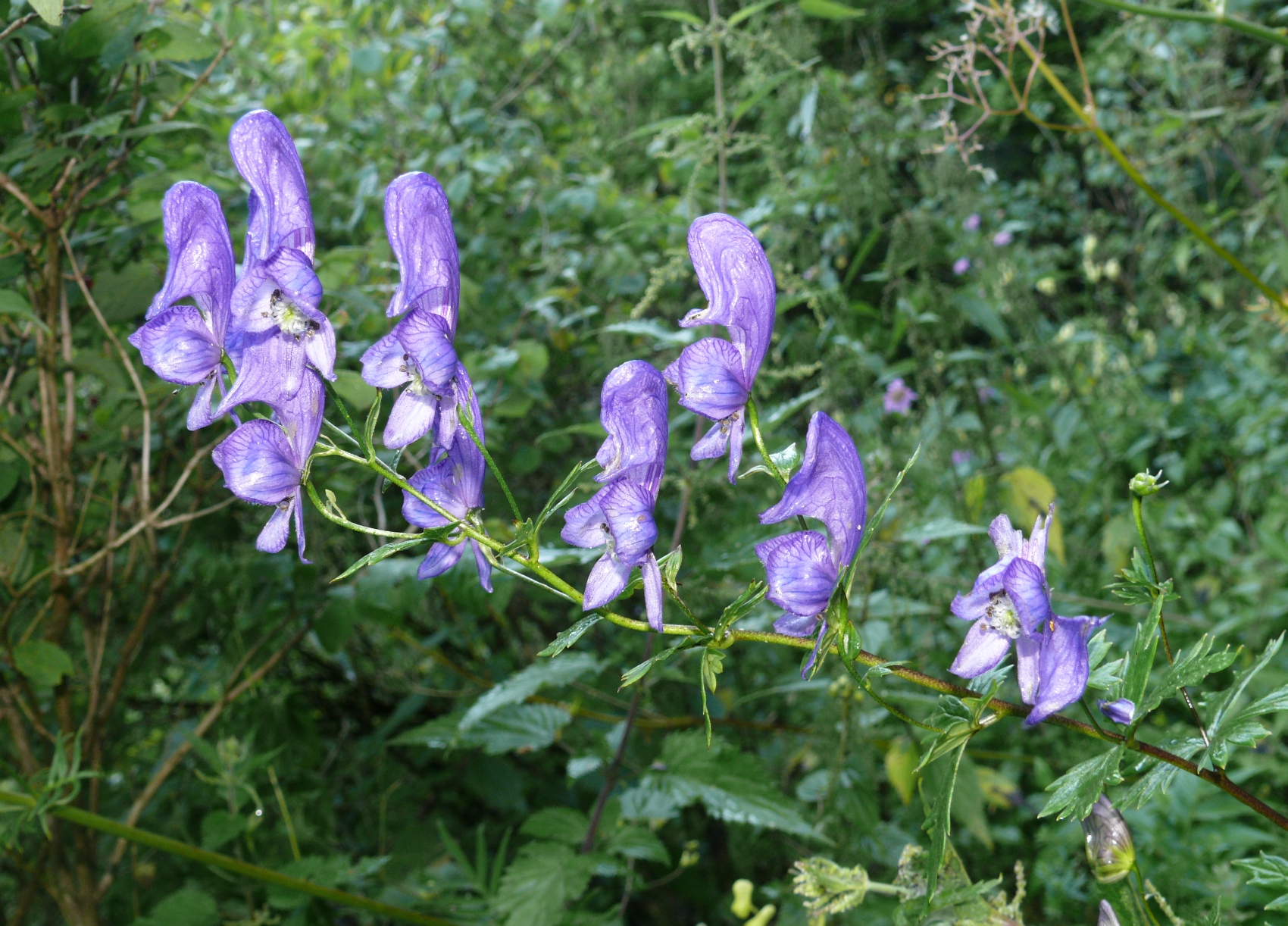

Scientific classification
- Kingdom: Plantae
- Clade: Tracheophytes
- Clade: Angiosperms
- Clade: Eudicots
- Order: Ranunculales
- Family: Ranunculaceae
- Genus: Aconitum
- Species: A. variegatum

Binomial name
- Aconitum variegatum L.

= Aconitum variegatum =

Species of flowering plant

Aconitum variegatum is a species of flowering plant belonging to the family Ranunculaceae.

Its native range is Central and Southeastern Europe to Central Ukraine.
