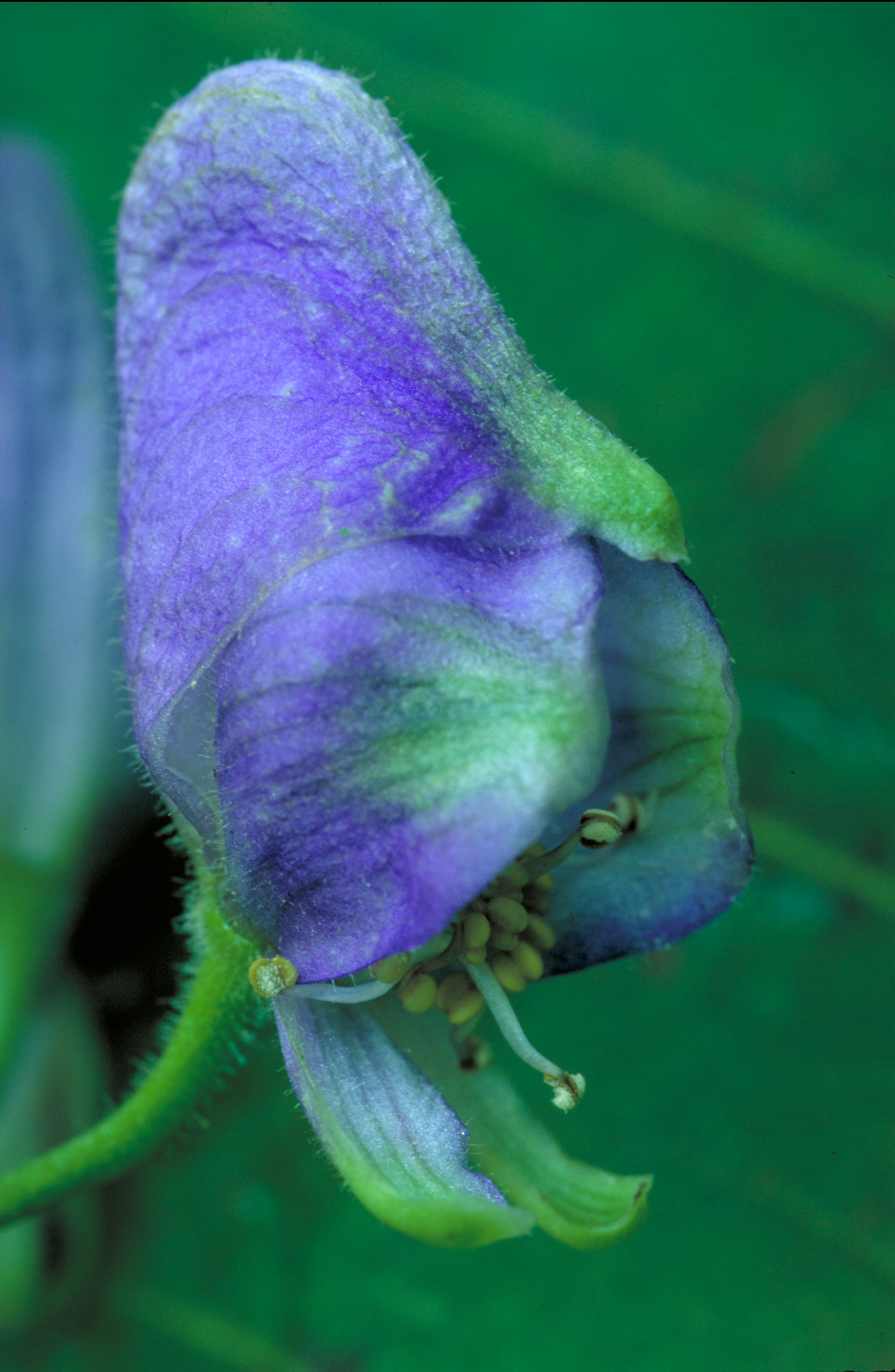

Conservation status
- Apparently Secure (NatureServe)

Scientific classification
- Kingdom: Plantae
- Clade: Tracheophytes
- Clade: Angiosperms
- Clade: Eudicots
- Order: Ranunculales
- Family: Ranunculaceae
- Genus: Aconitum
- Species: A. uncinatum

Binomial name
- Aconitum uncinatum L., 1762

= Aconitum uncinatum =

Species of flowering plant

Aconitum uncinatum, commonly known as wild monkshood or southern blue monkshood, is a species of flowering plant in the buttercup family, Ranunculaceae. It grows in moist to wet habitats along streams and in woods and clearings. It grows in the eastern United States in the Appalachian Mountains, on the Piedmont, and on the upper Atlantic Coastal Plain.

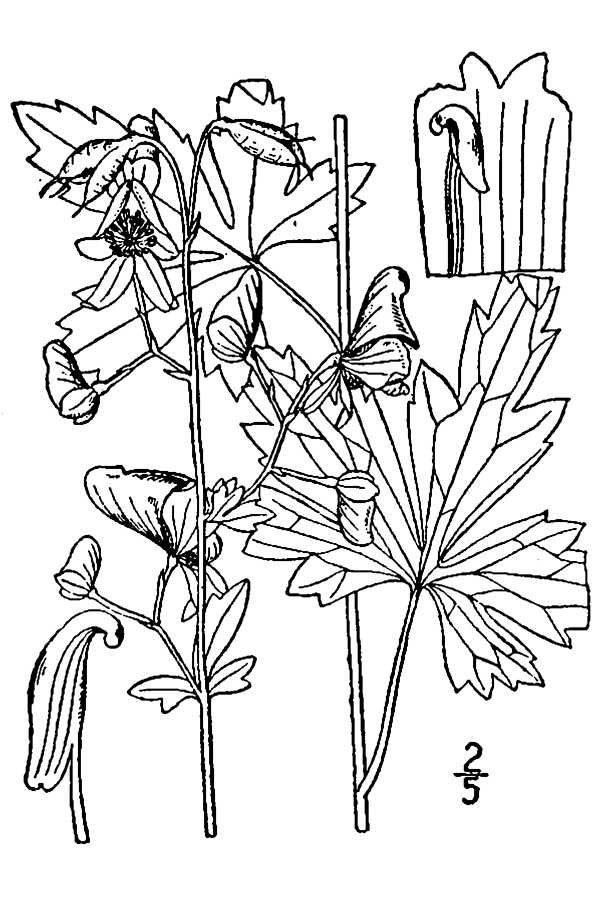
Illustration of Aconitum uncinatum

== Toxicity and uses ==
The roots and seeds contain alkaloids, which are most poisonous before flowering. The plant has been used to make medicine to treat neuralgia and sciatica.
