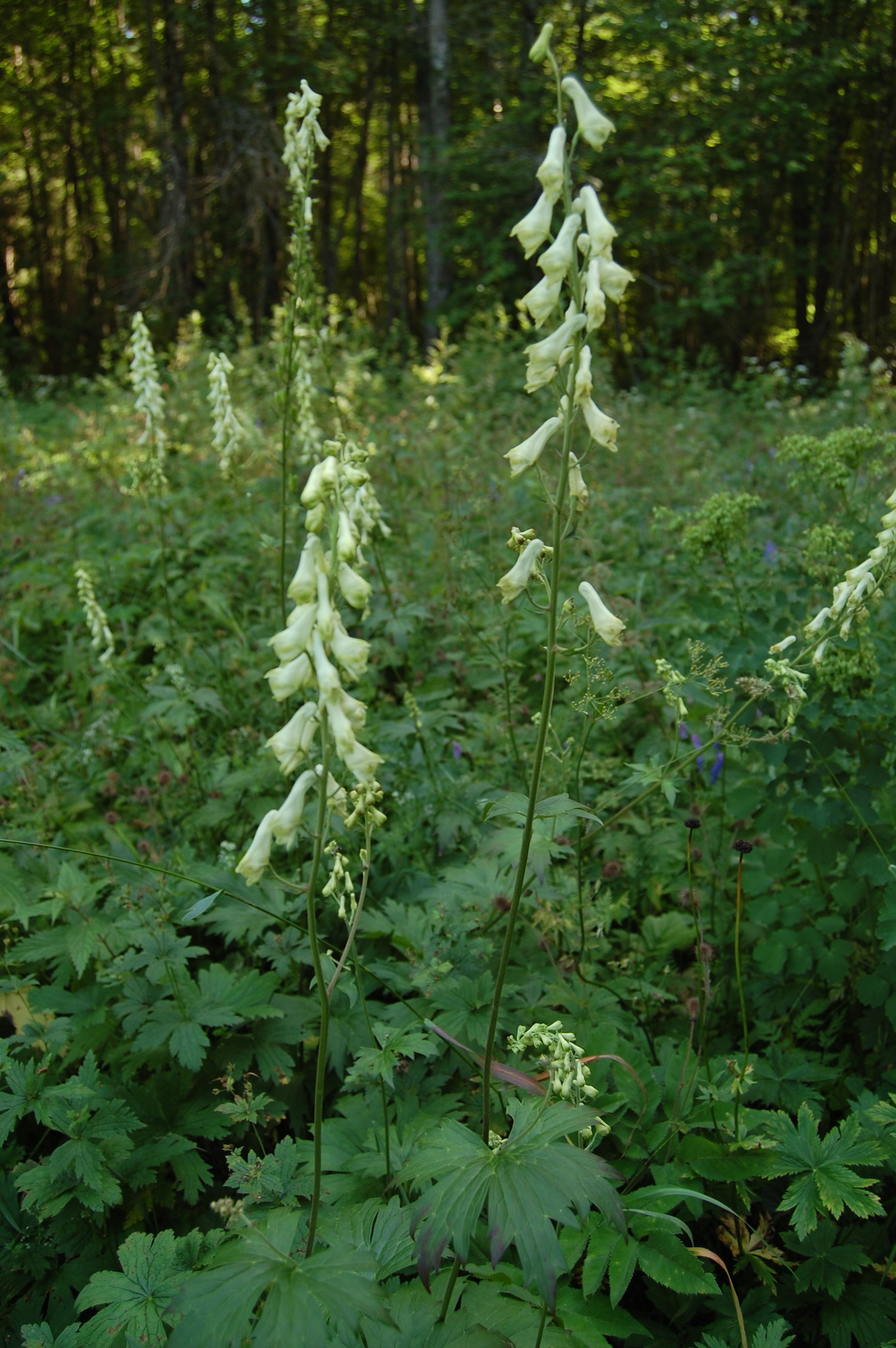

Scientific classification
- Kingdom: Plantae
- Clade: Tracheophytes
- Clade: Angiosperms
- Clade: Eudicots
- Order: Ranunculales
- Family: Ranunculaceae
- Genus: Aconitum
- Species: A. lasiostomum

Binomial name
- Aconitum lasiostomum Rchb.

= Aconitum lasiostomum =

Species of flowering plant

Aconitum lasiostomum is a species of flowering plant in the genus Aconitum, native to Eastern Europe.
