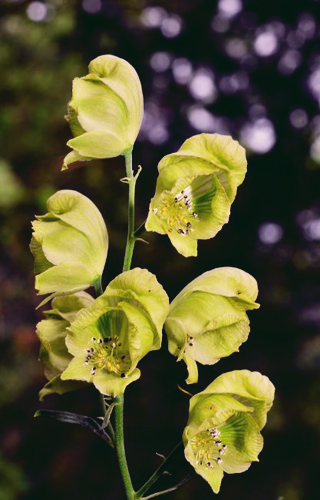

Conservation status
- Least Concern (IUCN 3.1)

Scientific classification
- Kingdom: Plantae
- Clade: Tracheophytes
- Clade: Angiosperms
- Clade: Eudicots
- Order: Ranunculales
- Family: Ranunculaceae
- Genus: Aconitum
- Species: A. coreanum

Binomial name
- Aconitum coreanum (H.Lév.) Rapaics

= Aconitum coreanum =

Species of plant

Aconitum coreanum, known as Korean monkshood, is one of the species of Aconitum. It is one of the crude botanical drugs that has been applied in Chinese medicine during past decades.

== Ecology ==
Aconitum coreanum is a perennial shrub with thickened roots growing to 100 centimetres (39 in) in height. It prefers a soil slightly retentive of moisture, such as a moist loam. The shade side of mountain valleys is preferred. Its stems are glabrous and strict. The plant is simple or branched with the leaves crowded. These leaves are alternate and palmately cleft 3-5 and long-petioled and upper leaves shorter almost sessile. Proximal cauline leaves are withered at anthesis. Its leaver are deeply divided again to lanceolate and sharply acuminate. The roots are poisonous. The flower's color is pale yellow or sometimes purplish tint. The flowers bloom from July to August. Its pedicels are short and has 5 petal-like sepals; the upper one clearly hooded, the others flat, the lower 2 narrower than the others. The entire plant is 30 centimetres (12 in) -100 centimetres (39 in) in height.

- Habitat: Grassy areas in mountain valleys or on slopes.
- Distribution: Korea, China, Mongolia, Far eastern Russia.

== Toxicology ==
Marked symptoms may appear almost immediately, usually not later than one hour, and "with large doses death is almost instantaneous." Death usually occurs within two to six hours in fatal poisoning (20 to 40 mL of tincture may prove fatal). The initial signs are gastrointestinal including nausea, vomiting, and diarrhea. This is followed by a sensation of burning, tingling, and numbness in the mouth and face, and of burning in the abdomen. In severe poisonings pronounced motor weakness occurs and cutaneous sensations of tingling and numbness spread to the limbs. Cardiovascular features include hypotension, sinus bradycardia, and ventricular arrhythmias. Other features may include sweating, dizziness, difficulty in breathing, headache, and confusion. The main causes of death are ventricular arrhythmias and asystole, paralysis of the heart or of the respiratory center. The only post-mortem signs are those of asphyxia.

Treatment of poisoning is mainly supportive. All patients require close monitoring of blood pressure and cardiac rhythm. Gastrointestinal decontamination with activated charcoal can be used if given within one hour of ingestion. The major physiological antidote is atropine, which is used to treat bradycardia. Other drugs used for ventricular arrhythmia include lidocaine, amiodarone, bretylium, flecainide, procainamide, and mexiletine. Cardiopulmonary bypass is used if symptoms are refractory to treatment with these drugs. Successful use of charcoal hemoperfusion has been claimed in patients with severe aconite poisoning.

Poisoning may also occur following picking the leaves without wearing gloves; the aconitine toxin is absorbed easily through the skin. In this event, there will be no gastrointestinal effects. Tingling will start at the point of absorption and extend up the arm to the shoulder, after which the heart will start to be affected. The tingling will be followed by unpleasant numbness. Treatment is similar to poisoning caused by oral ingestion.

Aconitine is a potent neurotoxin that opens tetrodotoxin sensitive sodium channels. It increases influx of sodium through these channels and delays repolarization, thus increasing excitability and promoting ventricular dysrhythmias.

== Traditional medicine ==
The root is traditionally used in Korea to treat chills in legs and arms and articular pain. In China, It has been used in immortal tonic among the folk remedies. However, its general uses in traditional Chinese medicine are for diuresis, cardiotonic, analgesia, neuralgia, gout and, furthermore, even neoplastic effect.

- Side effects: cardiotoxic, causing arrhythmia and hypotension if not processed to degrade ester-type alkaloids like aconitine.

Caffeoyl derivatives from the roots of Aconitum coreanum have been shown to have at least some anti-inflammatory effect in vitro.
