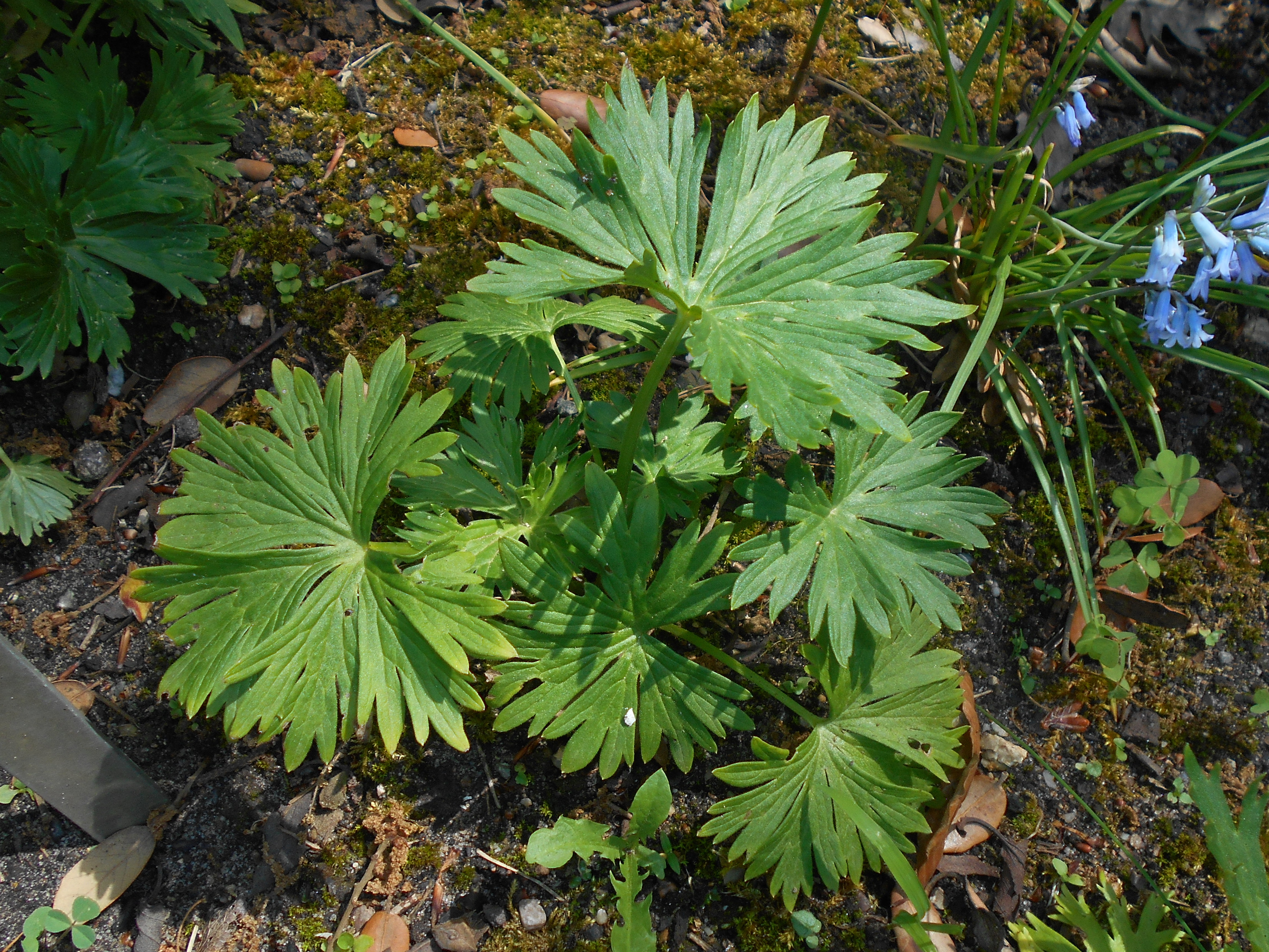

Scientific classification
- Kingdom: Plantae
- Clade: Tracheophytes
- Clade: Angiosperms
- Clade: Eudicots
- Order: Ranunculales
- Family: Ranunculaceae
- Genus: Aconitum
- Species: A. lamarckii

Binomial name
- Aconitum lamarckii Rchb.

= Aconitum lamarckii =

Species of flowering plant

Aconitum lamarckii, known by the common name Northern wolf's-bane, is a species of herbaceous flowering plant of the genus Aconitum, in the buttercup family, Ranunculaceae. It is native to Europe and sometimes cultivated in gardens in temperate zones for its showy flowers. It blooms from early to late summer with yellow flowers produced on tall, thin, somewhat lax stems.

== Etymology ==
The plant is named after Jean-Baptiste Lamarck.
