= Aconitum soongaricum =

Scientific classification
- Kingdom: Plantae
- Clade: Tracheophytes
- Clade: Angiosperms
- Clade: Eudicots
- Order: Ranunculales
- Family: Ranunculaceae
- Genus: Aconitum
- Species: A. soongaricum

Binomial name
- Aconitum soongaricum L.

Species of flowering plant

Aconitum soongaricum is a poisonous perennial herbaceous plant species of the genus Aconitum.

== Distribution and habitat ==
Aconitum soongaricum is endemic to Kashmir., China, Kyrgyzstan, Kazakhstan (the Dzungarian Alatau, Trans-Ili Alatau and Tarbagatai Mountains), at elevations of 2,500–3,000 meters. The specific name soongaricum means 'native to Dzungaria' - a region currently forming the northern part of Xinjiang in NW China, but bearing a name meaning 'land of the left-hand (i.e. 'western') Mongols'.

== Toxicity ==
All parts of the plant contain alkaloids associated with aconitic acid (primarily aconitine), but their concentration depends on the phase of vegetation. Spring shoots before flowering are the richest in alkaloids.

== Uses ==
Aconitum soongaricum has anti-inflammatory, antimicrobial, narcotic, antitumor, analgesic and antispasmodic effects.

The action is due to alkaloids, mainly aconitine, which is one of the most powerful plant poisons. When applied to the skin, it causes itching, followed by anesthesia. Aconitine poisoning, regardless of the method of administration, manifests itself in the form of itching and tingling in various parts of the body; aches; severe burning and pain in the gastrointestinal tract; and increased salivation. At the same time, dizziness, darkening in the eyes, dilated pupils, blanching of the skin, difficulty in breathing and cardiac arrhythmia are noted. Death occurs from respiratory arrest. Extreme toxicity limits the medicinal use of this plant.
