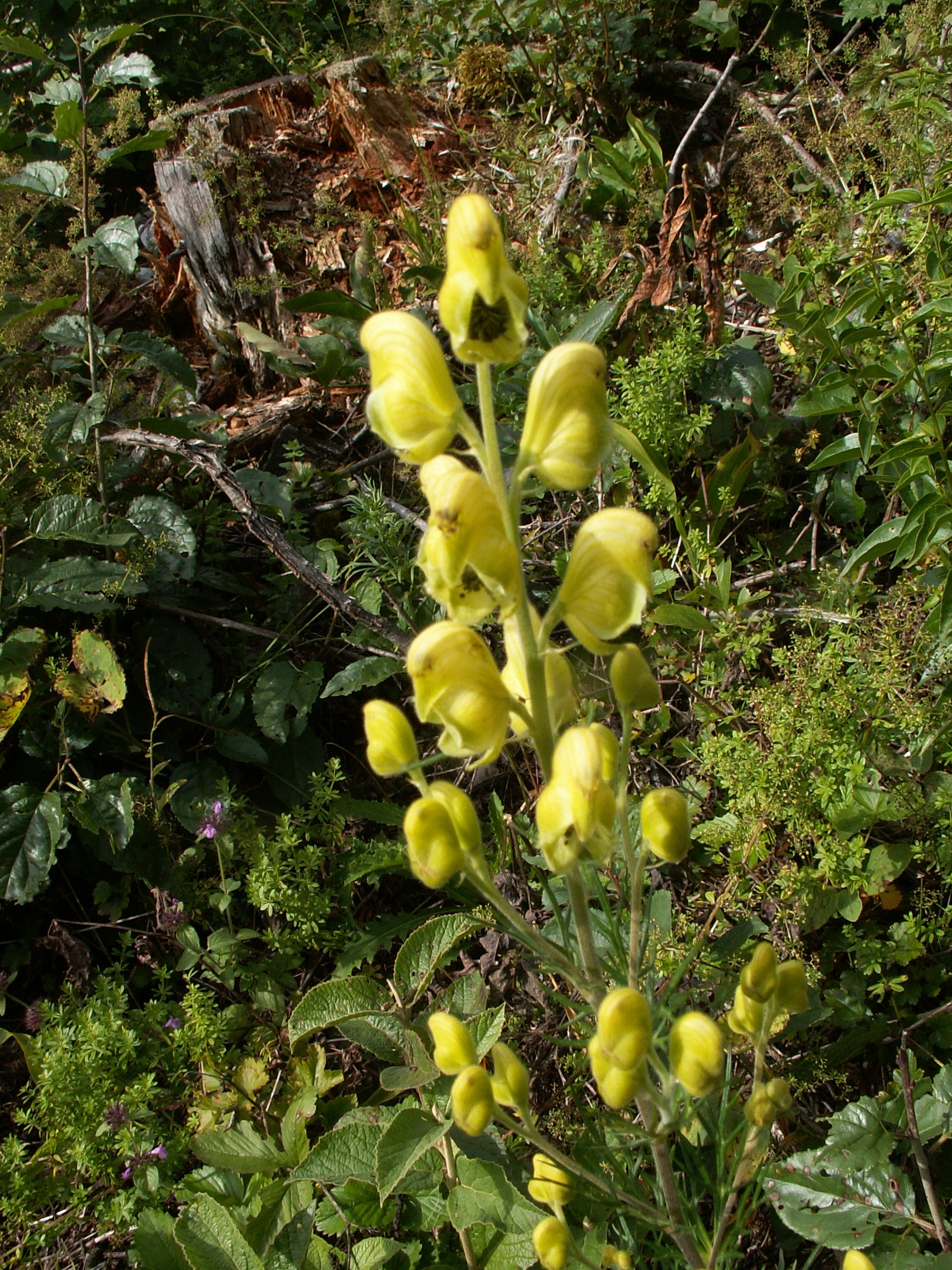

Scientific classification
- Kingdom: Plantae
- Clade: Tracheophytes
- Clade: Angiosperms
- Clade: Eudicots
- Order: Ranunculales
- Family: Ranunculaceae
- Genus: Aconitum
- Species: A. anthora

Binomial name
- Aconitum anthora L.

= Aconitum anthora =

Yellow monkshood

Species of plant

Aconitum anthora, variously known as anthora, yellow monkshood, or healing wolfsbane, is a yellow flowering plant species of the genus Aconitum in the family Ranunculaceae.

Its native range is widespread, but mainly in European mountains, such as the Alps and the Carpathians, and the northern parts of Asia. Like all Aconitum species, it has great variability, due to isolation and hybridisation. Because of this polymorphism, A. anthora is included in the Aconitum vulparia group. It flowers from July to September.

The name anthora or "against thora" stems from the historic reputation that the plant's tuberous root was a good antidote to poisons from 'thora' or Doronicum pardalianches, a plant that is extremely toxic to livestock and humans, with even small doses being potentially deadly.

The root contains a large amount of volatile salt and essential oil, while the foliage and stems contain diterpenoid alkaloids. It has been used externally against rheumatism and deep pain, but it can irritate the skin. Internally, it has been used for weak pulse, vegetable poisons (shoot), feverish colds, pneumonia, croup, heart conditions, and cardiac arrest.

== Synonyms ==
- Aconitum pseudanthora Blocki ex Pacz.
- Aconitum eulophum Rchb.
- Aconitum jacquinii Rchb.
- Aconitum nemorosum M.Bieb.
