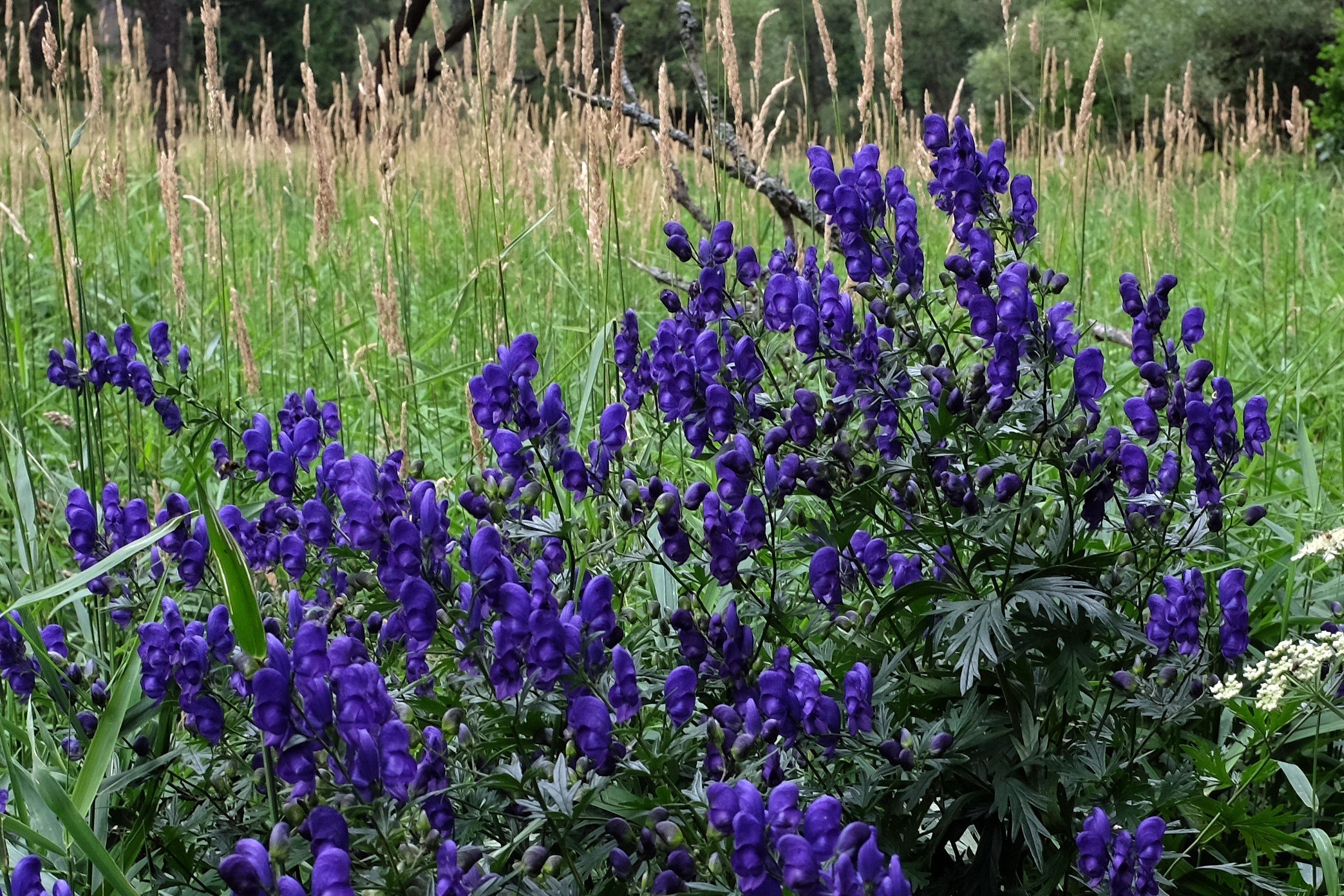
- Aconitum plicatum

Scientific classification
- Kingdom: Plantae
- Clade: Tracheophytes
- Clade: Angiosperms
- Clade: Eudicots
- Order: Ranunculales
- Family: Ranunculaceae
- Genus: Aconitum
- Species: A. plicatum

Binomial name
- Aconitum plicatum Köhler ex Rchb.

Synonyms
- Aconitum amoenum Aconitum bernhardianum Aconitum callibotryon Aconitum firmum f. calliobotryon Aconitum firmum var. rigidum Aconitum hians Aconitum koehleri Aconitum napellus subsp. hians Aconitum napellus var. laxum Aconitum rigidum Aconitum tauricum var. koehleri

= Aconitum plicatum =

Species of plant

Aconitum plicatum is a species of flowering plant in the buttercup family known by the common name garden monkshood.

== Distribution ==
This wildflower is native to Europe (Germany, Czech Republic and Poland). Inhabited biotops include tall herbaceous vegetation and ravine forests. Aconitum plicatum is also cultivated as ornamental plant.

== Description ==
Aconitum plicatum is a tall spindly erect to scandent forb which is perennial from rhizomes. It has divided leaves. The flowering period extends primarily from July to September. The inflorescence is paniculate and simple or branched with a few or many side risps. The perigon is blue or purple. The perigon is densely hairy on the outside and inside by crooked trichomes. The peduncle is hairy or bare. The bracteoles are linear to triangular and bare. The plant reaches a stature height between 0.3 and 1.5 m. The pollination is done by insects (Bombus spec. and others). The fruits are pod-like follicles. Aconitum plicatum is poisonous due to the presence of alkaloids like aconitine.

=== Subspecies ===
Currently 2 subspecies are accepted:

- Aconitum plicatum subsp. plicatum, autonym
- Aconitum plicatum subsp. sudeticum Mitka
