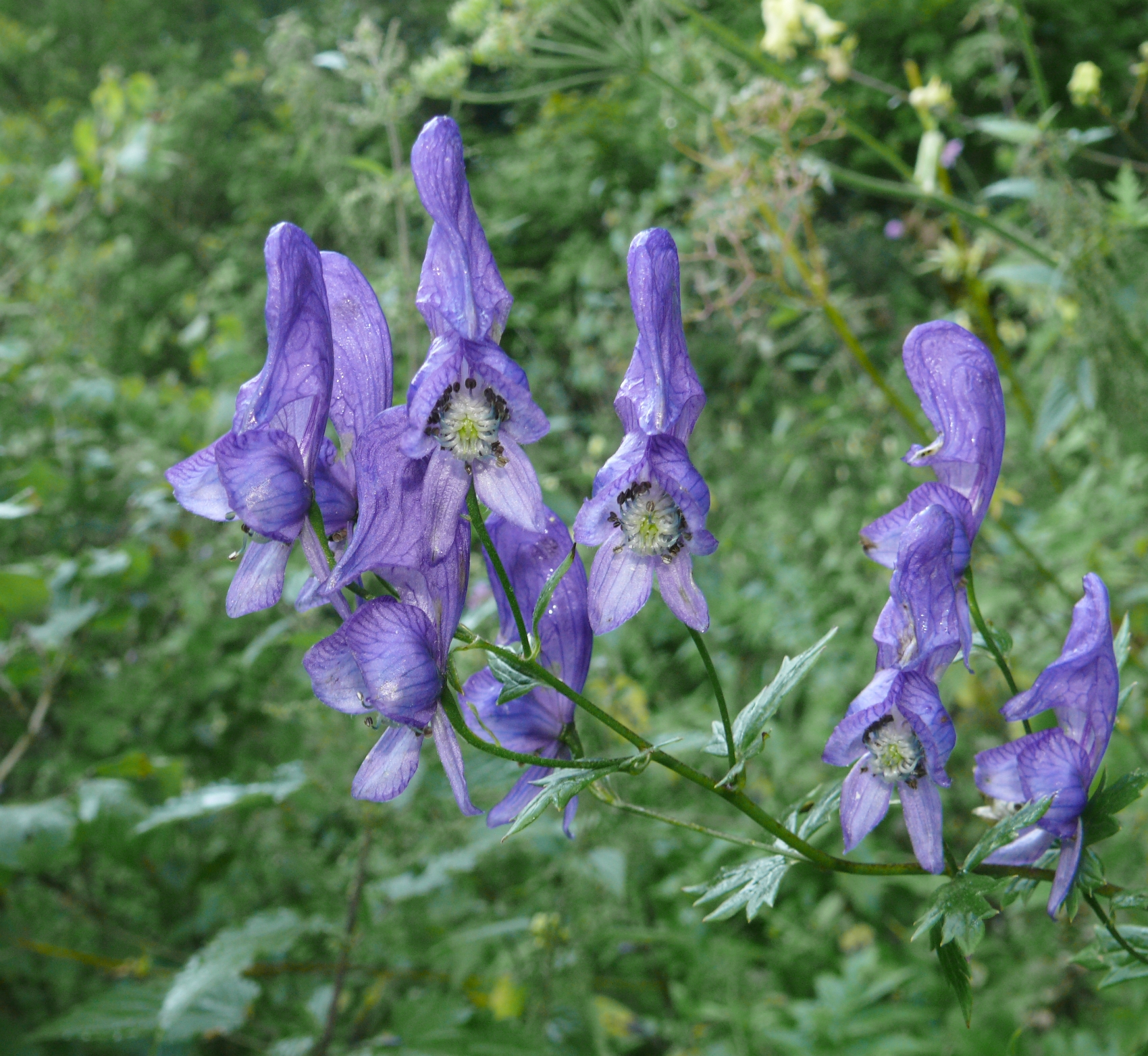
- Aconitum variegatum

Scientific classification
- Kingdom: Plantae
- Clade: Tracheophytes
- Clade: Angiosperms
- Clade: Eudicots
- Order: Ranunculales
- Family: Ranunculaceae
- Subfamily: Ranunculoideae
- Tribe: Delphinieae
- Genus: Aconitum; L.

Subgenera
- Aconitum subgenus Aconitum; Aconitum subgenus Lycoctonum (DC.) Peterm.; for species see below

= Aconitum =

Genus of flowering plants in the buttercup family

Aconitum (/ˌækəˈnaɪtəm/), also known as aconite, monkshood, wolfsbane (named for its use for poisoning wolves) , devil's helmet, or blue rocket, is a genus of over 250 species of flowering plants belonging to the family Ranunculaceae. These herbaceous, frequently toxic perennial plants are chiefly native to the mountainous parts of the Northern Hemisphere in North America, Europe, and Asia, growing in the moisture-retentive but well-draining soils of mountain meadows.

Most Aconitum species are extremely poisonous and must be handled very carefully. Several Aconitum hybrids, such as the Arendsii form of Aconitum carmichaelii, have won gardening awards—such as the Royal Horticultural Society's Award of Garden Merit.

== Etymology ==
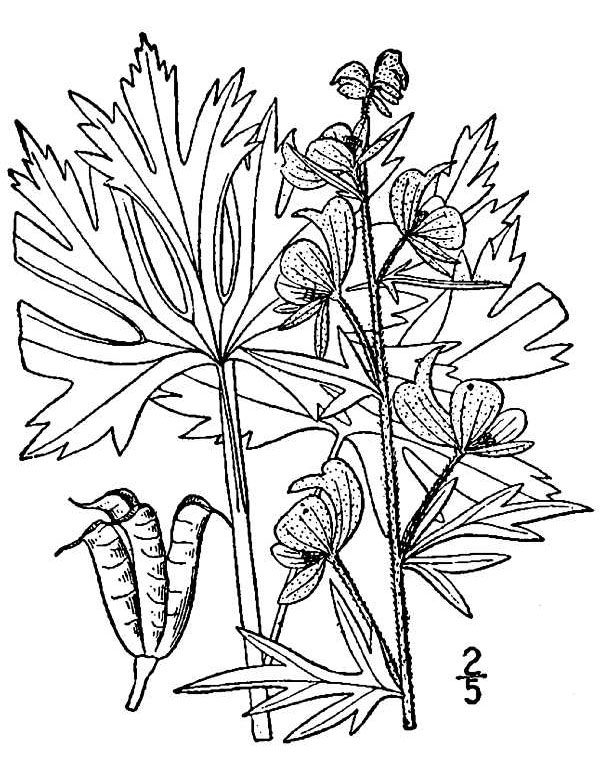
Northern blue monkshood (A. noveboracense)

The name aconitum comes from the Greek word ἀκόνιτον, which may derive from the Greek akon for dart or javelin, the tips of which were poisoned with the substance, or from akonae, because of the rocky ground on which the plant was thought to grow. The Greek name lycoctonum, which translates literally to "wolf's bane", is thought to indicate the use of its juice to poison arrows or baits used to kill wolves. The English name monkshood refers to the cylindrical helmet, called the galea, distinguishing the flower.

== Description ==
The dark green leaves of Aconitum species lack stipules. They are palmate or deeply palmately lobed with five to seven segments. Each segment is trilobed with coarse sharp teeth. The leaves have a spiral (alternate) arrangement. The lower leaves have long petioles.

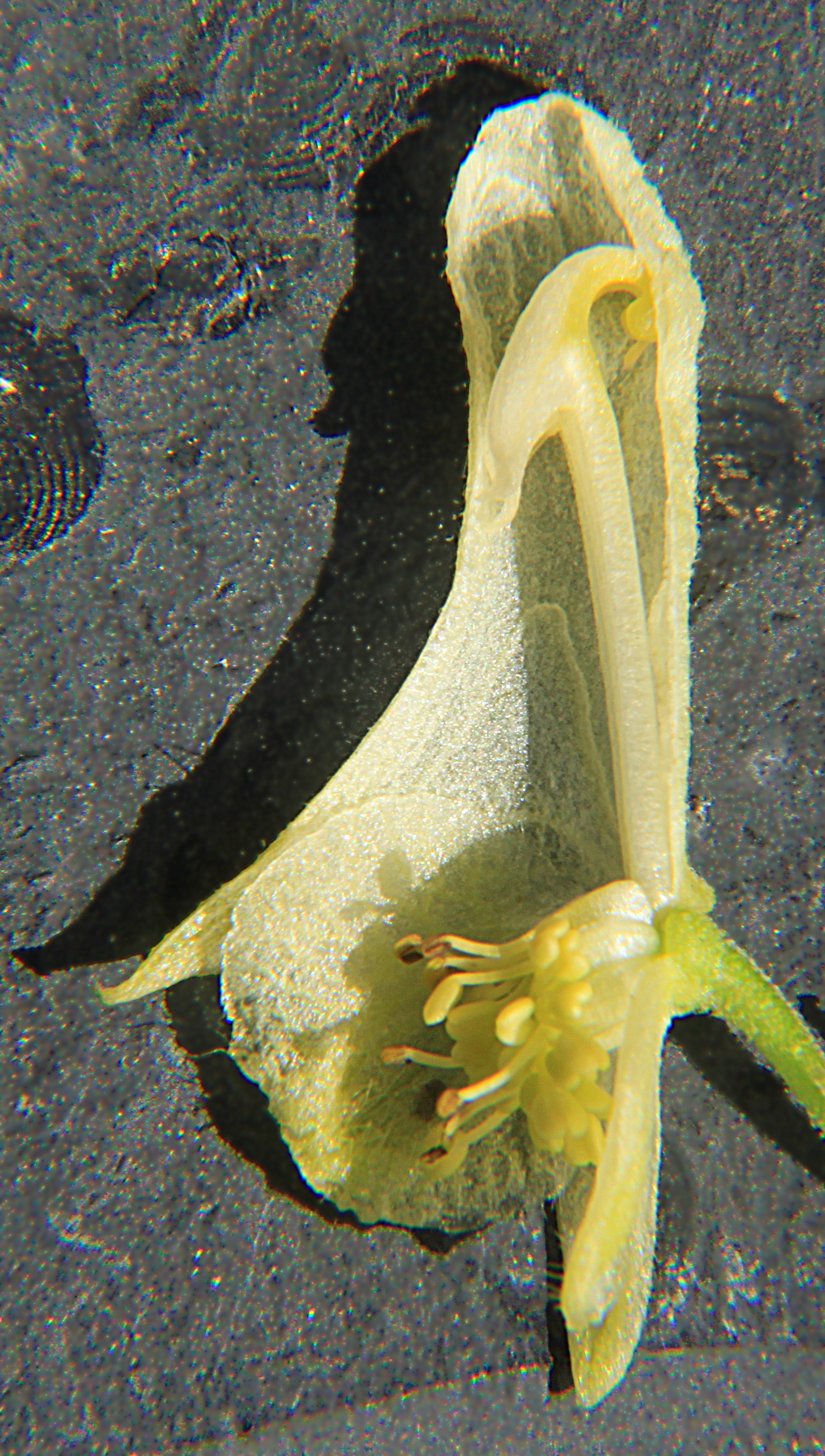
Dissected flower of Aconitum vulparia, showing the nectaries

The tall, erect stem is crowned by racemes of large blue, purple, white, yellow, or pink zygomorphic flowers with numerous stamens. They are distinguishable by having one of the five petaloid sepals (the posterior one), called the galea, in the form of a cylindrical helmet, hence the English name monkshood. Two to ten petals are present. The two upper petals are large and are placed under the hood of the calyx and are supported on long stalks. They have a hollow spur at their apex, containing the nectar. The other petals are small and scale-like or nonforming. The three to five carpels are partially fused at the base.

The fruit is an aggregate of follicles, a follicle being a dry, many-seeded structure.

Unlike with many species from genera (and their hybrids) in Ranunculaceae (and the related Papaveroideae subfamily), there are no double-flowered forms.

=== Color range ===
A medium to dark semi-saturated blue-purple is the typical flower color for Aconitum species. Aconitum species tend to be variable enough in form and color in the wild to cause debate and confusion among experts when it comes to species classification boundaries. The overall color range of the genus is rather limited, although the palette has been extended a small amount with hybridization. In the wild, some Aconitum blue-purple shades can be very dark. In cultivation the shades do not reach this level of depth.

Aside from blue-purple—white, very pale greenish-white, creamy white, and pale greenish-yellow are also somewhat common in nature. Wine red (or red-purple) occurs in a hybrid of the climber Aconitum hemsleyanum. There is a pale semi-saturated pink produced by cultivation as well as bicolor hybrids (e.g. white centers with blue-purple edges). Purplish shades range from very dark blue-purple to a very pale lavender that is quite greyish. The latter occurs in the "Stainless Steel" hybrid.

Neutral blue (rather than purplish or greenish), greenish-blue, and intense blues, available in some related Delphinium plants—particularly Delphinium grandiflorum—do not occur in this genus. Aconitum plants that have purplish-blue flowers are often inaccurately referred to as having blue flowers, even though the purple tone dominates. If there are species with true (neutral) blue or greenish-blue flowers they are rare and do not occur in cultivation. Also unlike the genus Delphinium, there are no bright red nor intense pink Aconitum flowers, as none known are pollinated by hummingbirds. There are no orange-flowered varieties nor any that are green. Aconitum is typically more intense in color than Helleborus but less intense than Delphinium. There are no blackish flowers in Aconitum, unlike with Helleborus.

Monkshood (Aconitum napellus) produces light indigo-blue flowers, while Wolf's Bane (Aconitum vulparia) produces whitish or straw-yellow flowers.

=== Horticultural trade morphology ===
The lack of double-flowered forms in the horticultural trade stands in contrast with the other genera of Ranunculaceae used regularly in gardens. This includes one major genus that is known solely by most gardeners for a double-flowered form of one species—Ranunculus asiaticus, known colloquially in the trade as "Ranunculus". The Ranunculus genus contains approximately 500 species. One other species of Ranunculus has seen minor use in gardens, the 'Flore Pleno' (doubled) form of Ranunculus acris. Doubled forms of Consolida and Delphinium dominate the horticultural trade while single forms of Anemone, Aquilegia, Clematis, Helleborus, Pulsatilla—and the related Papaver—retain some popularity. No doubled forms of Aconitum are known.

== Ecology ==
Aconitum species have been recorded as food plant of the caterpillars of several moths. The yellow tiger moth Arctia flavia, and the purple-shaded gem Euchalcia variabilis are at home on A. vulparia. The engrailed Ectropis crepuscularia, yellow-tail Euproctis similis, mouse moth Amphipyra tragopoginis, pease blossom Periphanes delphinii, and Mniotype bathensis, have been observed feeding on A. napellus. The purple-lined sallow Pyrrhia exprimens, and Blepharita amica were found eating from A. septentrionale. The dot moth Melanchra persicariae occurs both on A. septentrionale and A. intermedium. The golden plusia Polychrysia moneta is hosted by A. vulparia, A. napellus, A. septentrionale, and A. intermedium. Other moths associated with Aconitum species include the wormwood pug Eupithecia absinthiata, satyr pug E. satyrata, Aterpia charpentierana, and A. corticana. It is also the primary food source for the Old World bumblebees Bombus consobrinus and Bombus gerstaeckeri.

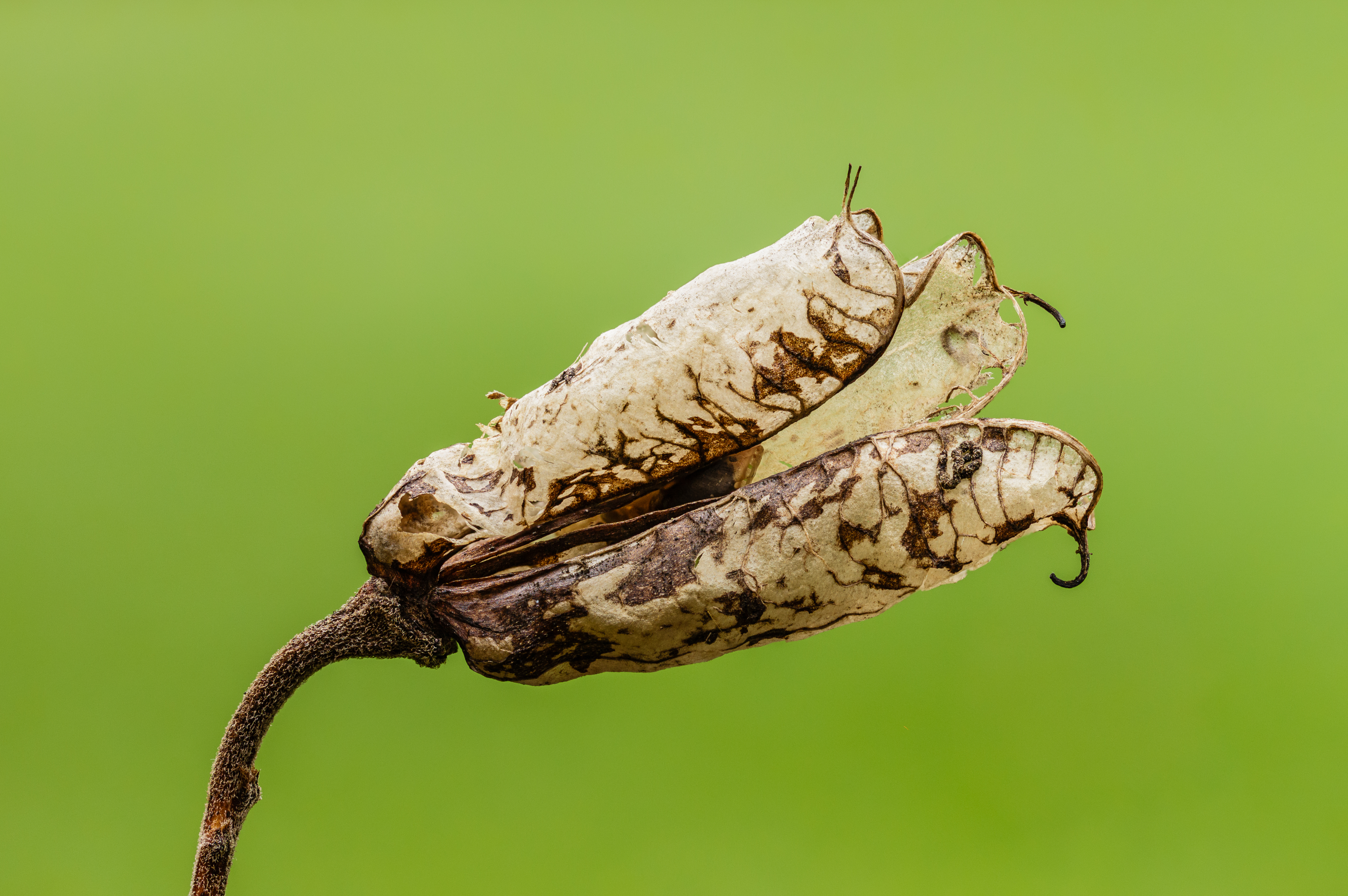
Empty seed pod

Aconitum flowers are pollinated by long-tongued bumblebees. Bumblebees have the strength to open the flowers and reach the single nectary at the top of the flower on its inside. Some short-tongued bees will bore holes into the tops of the flowers to steal nectar. However, alkaloids in the nectar function as a deterrent for species unsuited to pollination. The effect is greater in certain species, such as Aconitum napellus, than in others, such as Aconitum lycoctonum. Unlike the species with blue-purple flowers such as A. napellus, A. lycoctonum—which has off-white to pale yellow flowers, has been found to be a nectar source for butterflies. This is likely due to the nectary flowers of the latter being more easily reachable by the butterflies; however, the differing alkaloid character of the two plants may also play a significant role or be the primary influence.

== Cultivation ==
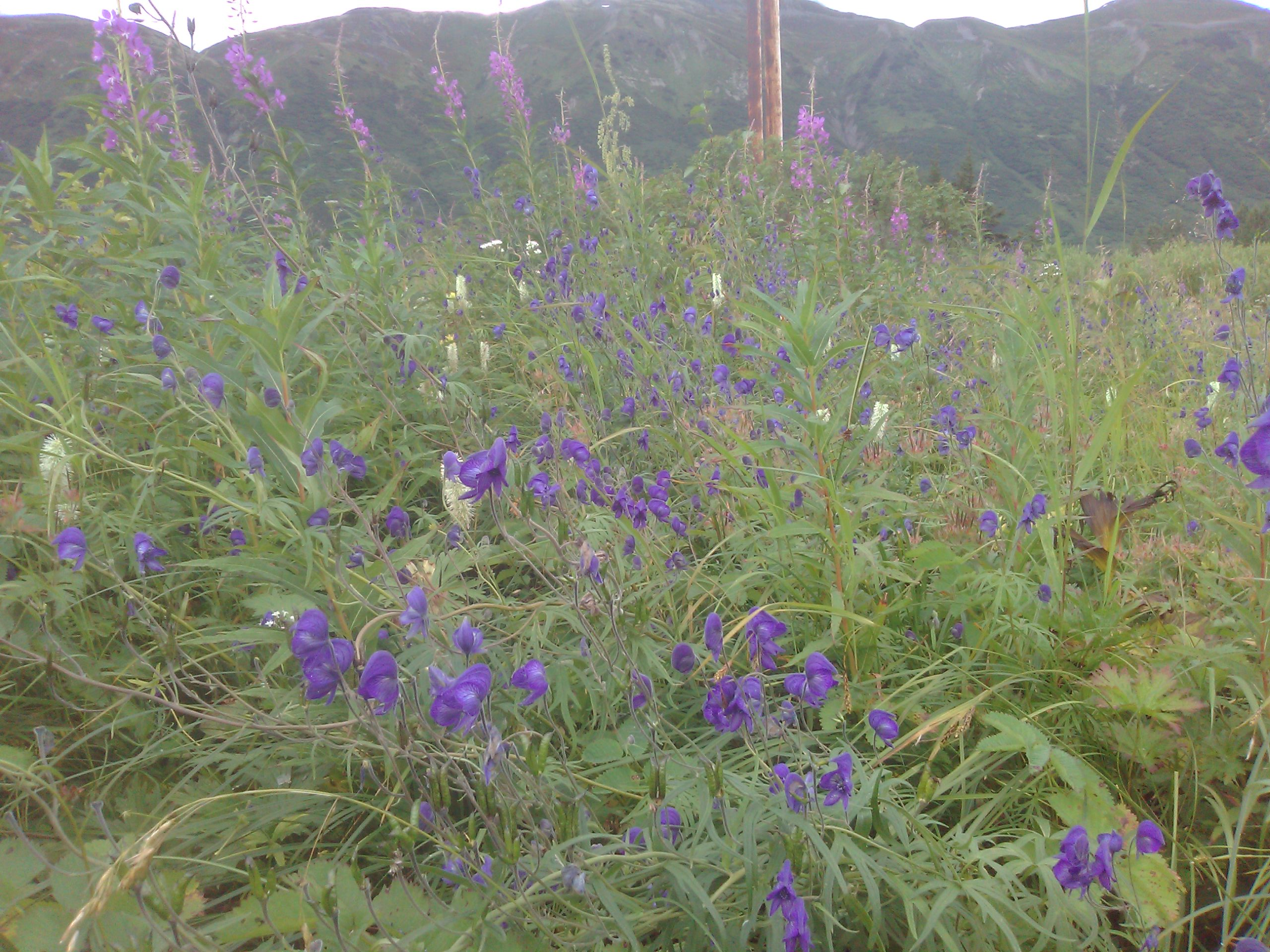
Aconitum delphinifolium growing in its natural habitat, Alaska

The species typically utilized by gardeners fare well in well-drained evenly moist "humus-rich" garden soils like many in the related Helleborus and Delphinium genera, and can grow in the partial shade. Species not used in gardens tend to require more exacting conditions (e.g. Aconitum noveboracense). Most Aconitum species prefer to have their roots cool and moist, with the majority of the leaves exposed to sun, like the related Clematis. Aconitum species can be propagated by divisions of the root or by seeds, with care taken to avoid leaving pieces of the root where livestock might be poisoned. All parts of these plants should be handled while wearing protective disposable gloves. Aconitum plants are typically much longer-lived than the closely related delphinium plants, putting less energy into floral reproduction. As a result, they are not described as being "heavy feeders" (needing a higher quantity of fertilizer versus most other flowering plants)—unlike gardeners' delphiniums. As with most in the Ranunculaceae and Papaveraceae families, they dislike root disturbance. As with most in Ranunculaceae, seeds that are not planted soon after harvesting should be stored moist-packed in vermiculite to avoid dormancy and viability issues. The German seed company Jelitto offers "Gold Nugget" seeds that are advertised as utilizing a coating that enables the seed to germinate immediately, bypassing the double dormancy defect (from a typical gardener's point of view) Aconitum—and many other species in Ranunculaceae genera—use as a reproductive strategy. By contrast, seeds that are not immediately planted or moist-packed are described as perhaps taking as long as two years to germinate, being prone to very erratic germination (in terms of time required per seed), and comparatively quick seed viability loss (e.g. Adonis). These issues are typical for many species in Ranunculaceae, such as Pulsatilla (pasqueflower).

=== Award-winning hybrids ===
In the UK, the following have gained the Royal Horticultural Society's Award of Garden Merit:

- A. × cammarum 'Bicolor'
- A. carmichaelii 'Arendsii'
- A. carmichaelii 'Kelmscott'
- A. 'Bressingham Spire'
- A. 'Spark's Variety'
- A. 'Stainless Steel'

== Toxicology ==
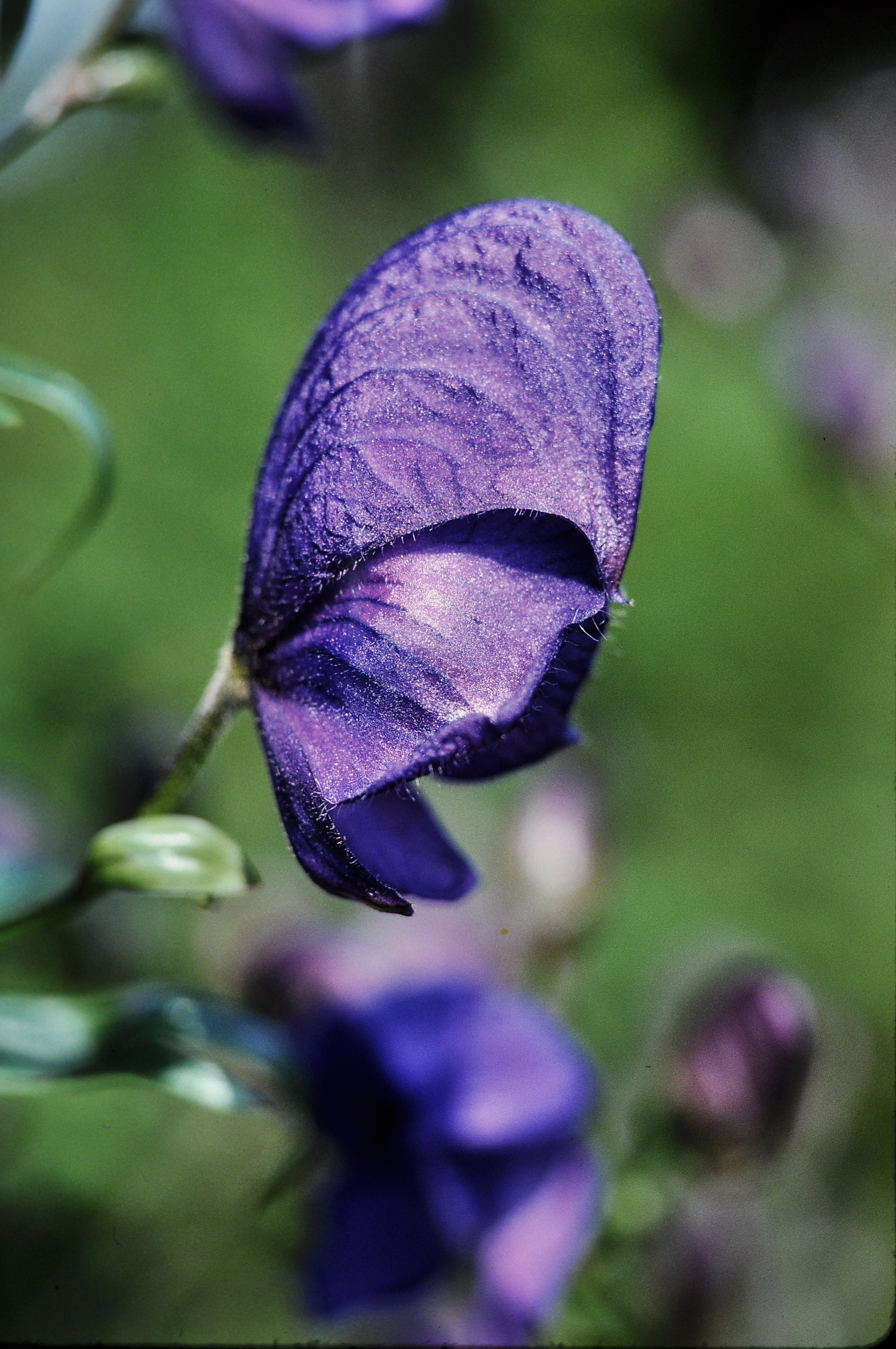
Monkshood, Aconitum napellus

Members of the genus Aconitum contain substantial amounts of highly toxic alkaloids (such as aconitine, mesaconitine, and pseudaconitine), especially in their roots and tubers. Ingestion of as little as 2 mg of aconitine or 1 g of plant material may cause death from respiratory paralysis or heart failure.

Mild to severe toxicity may be experienced from skin contact. Symptoms such as numbness and tingling and feelings of coldness in the face and extremities usually appear within one hour of exposure, and sometimes almost immediately. Other features may include nausea, vomiting, diarrhea, sweating, dizziness, difficulty in breathing, headache, and confusion. In severe poisoning, sensations of tingling and numbness spreads to the limbs, and pronounced motor weakness occurs. Cardiovascular features include low blood pressure and abnormal heart rhythm. Death usually occurs within two to six hours in fatal poisoning.

Treatment of poisoning involves close monitoring of blood pressure and cardiac rhythm. Gastrointestinal decontamination with activated charcoal can be used if administered within an hour or so of ingestion. Drugs such as atropine, lidocaine, and amiodarone may be used to treat dysrhythmias. Cardiopulmonary bypass, Extracorporeal membrane oxygenation, and hemoperfusion may be useful if symptoms are refractory to treatment with these drugs.

== Uses ==
=== Folk medicine ===
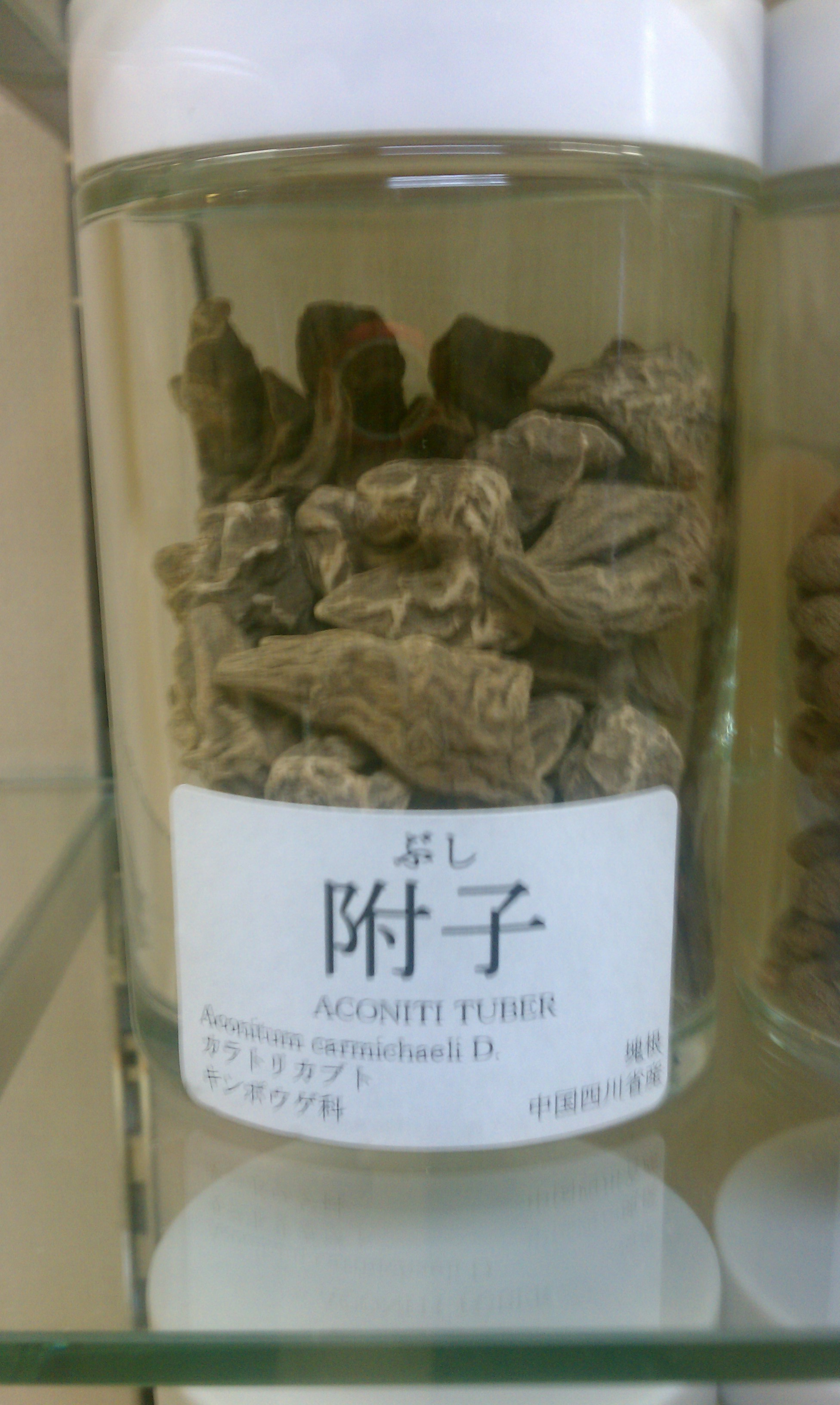
Plant as used in Chinese-style herbology (crude medicine) (in Japanese)

Aconite was described in ancient Greek and Roman medicine by Theophrastus, Dioscorides, and Pliny the Elder. Folk medicinal use of Aconitum species is practiced in some parts of Slovenia.

In Ming China, iron tools with aconitine residue from the tomb of a doctor named Xia Quan (1348–1411 CE) suggests the use of wolfsbane as anesthetic. A producer of Yunnan Baiyao, a traditional Chinese medicine remedy, has disclosed that the preparation contains aconite.

=== As a poison ===
The roots of A. ferox contain large quantities of the alkaloid pseudaconitine; they have been used in the production of the poison called bikh, bish, or nabee in Nepal.

Aconite has traditionally been used in many cultures in the preparation of arrow poisons. For example, the Brokpa people in Ladakh have been known to use aconite poisons on their arrows to hunt Siberian ibex. The Matagi and Ainu people also used aconite preparations to hunt bear. They were also used by the Aleut people for hunting whales. The Chinese were known to use aconite poisons both for hunting and for warfare. Aconite-tipped arrows are also described in the Rigveda.

It has been hypothesized that Socrates was executed using aconite rather than with hemlock. It has also been suggested that Alexander the Great and Ptolemy XIV Philopator were assassinated with aconite.

An early human trial with a control arm took place in 1524, when Pope Clement VII poisoned a pair of prisoners with aconite-laced marzipan, testing an antidote on one that survived, leaving the untreated prisoner to suffer a painful death.

In April 2021, the president of Kyrgyzstan, Sadyr Japarov, promoted aconite root as a treatment for COVID-19. Subsequently, at least four people were admitted to hospitals suffering from poisoning. Facebook removed Japarov's posts advocating use of the substance, saying "We've removed this post as we do not allow anyone, including elected officials, to share misinformation that could lead to imminent physical harm or spread false claims about how to cure or prevent COVID-19".

== Taxonomy ==
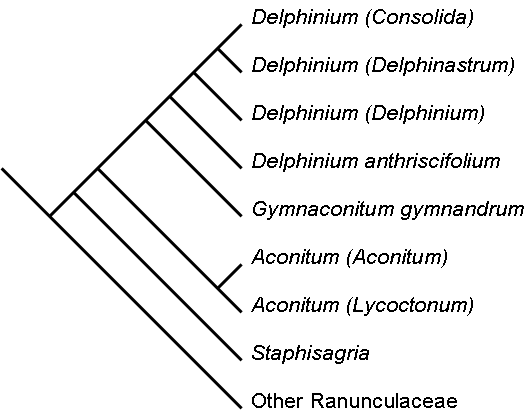
Subgenera of Aconitum and related taxa

Genetic analysis suggests that Aconitum as it was delineated before the 21st century is nested within Delphinium sensu lato, that also includes Aconitella, Consolida, Delphinium staphisagria, D. requini, and D. pictum. Further genetic analysis has shown that the only species of the subgenus "Aconitum (Gymnaconitum)", "A. gymnandrum", is sister to the group that consists of Delphinium (Delphinium), Delphinium (Delphinastrum), and "Consolida" plus "Aconitella". To make Aconitum monophyletic, "A. gymnandrum" has now been reassigned to a new genus, Gymnaconitum. To make Delphinium monophyletic, the new genus Staphisagria was erected containing S. staphisagria, S. requini, and S. pictum.

Aconitum chasmanthum is listed as critically endangered, Aconitum heterophyllum as endangered, and Aconitum violaceum as vulnerable due to overcollection for use as an herbal medicine.

=== Selected species ===
- Aconitum anthora (yellow monkshood)
- Aconitum anthoroideum
- Aconitum bucovinense
- Aconitum carmichaelii (Carmichael's monkshood)
- Aconitum columbianum (western monkshood)
- Aconitum coreanum (Korean monkshood)
- Aconitum degenii (branched monkshood)
- Aconitum delphinifolium (larkspurleaf monkshood)
- Aconitum ferox (Indian aconite)
- Aconitum firmum
- Aconitum fischeri (Fischer monkshood)
- Aconitum flavum (Fluff iron hammer)
- Aconitum hemsleyanum (climbing monkshood)
- Aconitum henryi (Sparks variety monkshood)
- Aconitum heterophyllum
- Aconitum infectum (Arizona monkshood)
- Aconitum jacquinii (synonym of A. anthora)
- Aconitum koreanum (synonym of "Aconitum coreanum")
- Aconitum kusnezoffii (Kusnezoff monkshood)
- Aconitum lamarckii (northern wolfsbane)
- Aconitum lasiostomum
- Aconitum lycoctonum (northern wolfsbane)
- Aconitum maximum (Kamchatka aconite)
- Aconitum napellus
- Aconitum noveboracense (northern blue monkshood)
- Aconitum plicatum (garden monkshood)
- Aconitum reclinatum (trailing white monkshood)
- Aconitum rogoviczii
- Aconitum septentrionale
- Aconitum soongaricum
- Aconitum sukaczevii
- Aconitum tauricum
- Aconitum uncinatum (southern blue monkshood)
- Aconitum variegatum
- Aconitum violaceum
- Aconitum vulparia (wolf's bane)

=== Phylogeny ===
Classification of Zhang et al. 2024 (PCG):

- Aconitum
  - Subgenus Lycoctonum
    - Aconitum scaposum
    - - - Aconitum barbatum
        - - Aconitum sinomontanum
          - Aconitum umbrosum
      - - Aconitum reclinatum
        - - - Aconitum angustius
            - Aconitum longecassidatum
          - - Aconitum finetianum
            - - Aconitum pseudolaeve
              - - Aconitum quelpaertense
                - Aconitum puchonroenicum
  - Subgenus Aconitum
    - Aconitum coreanum
    - - Aconitum tanguticum
      - - - Aconitum monanthum
          - - Aconitum austrokoreense !
            - - Aconitum chisanense
              - - - Aconitum tschangbaischanense
                  - - Aconitum kusnezoffii
                    - - Aconitum japonicum
                      - - Aconitum ciliare
                        - Aconitum carmichaelii
                - - - Aconitum paniculigerum
                    - Aconitum austrokoreense !
                  - - Aconitum volubile
                    - - Aconitum macrorhynchum
                      - Aconitum jaluense
        - - - - Aconitum contortum
              - Aconitum stylosum
            - - - Aconitum duclouxii
                - Aconitum nagarum
              - - Aconitum flavum
                - - Aconitum brachypodum
                  - Aconitum pendulum
          - - - - Aconitum piepunense
                - Aconitum habaense
              - - Aconitum ouvradianum
                - - Aconitum ramulosum
                  - Aconitum bulleyanum
            - - - Aconitum episcopale
                - - Aconitum forrestii
                  - - Aconitum delavayi
                    - Aconitum stapfianum
              - - Aconitum hemsleyanum
                - - Aconitum vilmorinianum
                  - - Aconitum transsectum
                    - Aconitum weixiense (or A. transsectum ssp. weixiense)

Classification of Yanfei 2023 (cpDNA):

- Aconitum
  - Subgenus Paraconitum
    - Aconitum scaposum
    - - - Aconitum finetianum
        - Aconitum longecassidatum
      - - Aconitum sinomontanum
        - Aconitum barbatum
  - Subgenus Aconitum
    - Aconitum tanguticum
    - - - Aconitum monanthum
        - - Aconitum kusnezoffii
          - - Aconitum volubile
            - - Aconitum carmichaelii
              - Aconitum jaluense
      - - - - Aconitum stylosum
            - Aconitum contortum
          - - - Aconitum pendulum
              - Aconitum brachypodum
            - - Aconitum duclouxii
              - Aconitum nagarum
        - - Aconitum austroyunnanense
          - - - Aconitum piepunense
              - - Aconitum bulleyanum
                - - Aconitum ramulosum
                  - Aconitum delavayi
            - - Aconitum transsectum
              - - Aconitum vilmorinianum
                - - Aconitum episcopale
                  - Aconitum forrestii

== In literature and popular culture ==
Aconite and wolfsbane have been understood to be poisonous from ancient times, and are frequently represented as such in literature. In Greek mythology, the goddess Hecate is said to have invented aconite, which Athena used to transform Arachne into a spider. Medea is also said to have attempted to poison Theseus with a cup of wine poisoned with wolf's bane.

In the poem Metamorphoses, Ovid tells of the herb coming from the slavering mouth of Cerberus, the three-headed dog that guarded the gates of Hades. In his Natural History, Pliny the Elder supports the legend that aconite came from the saliva of the dog Cerberus when Hercules dragged him from the underworld. As the veterinary historian John Blaisdell has noted, symptoms of aconite poisoning in humans bear similarity to those of rabies: frothy saliva, impaired vision, vertigo, and finally, coma; thus, ancient Greeks could have believed that this poison, mythically born of Cerberus's lips, was literally the same as found inside the mouth of a rabid dog.

The opening lines of the Ode on Melancholy by John Keats warn against taking poison as a radical cure for a 'melancholy fit':

"No, no, go not to Lethe, neither twist Wolf's-bane, tight-rooted, for its poisonous wine…"

=== In popular culture ===
==== Early examples ====
As a well-known poison from ancient times, aconite (including as wolfsbane, in its various spellings) often found place in historical fiction. In I, Claudius, Livia, wife of Augustus, was portrayed discussing the merits, antidotes, and use of aconite with a poisoner. It is the poison used by a murderer in the third of the Cadfael Chronicles, Monk's Hood by Ellis Peters, published in 1980 and set in 1138 in Shrewsbury, England.

The kyōgen (traditional Japanese comedy) play Busu (附子; "Dried aconite root"), which is well-known and frequently taught in Japan, is centered on dried aconite root used for traditional Chinese medicine. Taken from Shasekishu, a 13th-century anthology collected by Mujū, the story describes servants who decide that the dried aconite root is really sugar, and suffer unpleasant though nonlethal symptoms after eating it.

In the 16th century, Shakespeare, writing in Henry IV Part II Act 4 Scene 4, refers to aconite, alongside rash gunpowder, working as strongly as the "venom of suggestion" to break up close relationships.

==== 20th century and later ====
An overdose of aconite was the method by which Rudolph Bloom, father of Leopold Bloom in James Joyce's Ulysses, died by suicide.

In the 1931 classic horror film Dracula starring Bela Lugosi as Count Dracula and Helen Chandler as Mina Seward, reference is made to wolf's bane (aconitum); towards the end of the film, "Van Helsing holds up a sprig of wolf's bane". Van Helsing educates the nurse protecting Mina from Count Dracula to place sprigs of wolf's bane around Mina's neck for protection, instructing that wolf's bane, a plant that grows in Central Europe, is used by those dwelling there to protect themselves against vampires.

In the 1941 film The Wolf Man starring Lon Chaney Jr. and Claude Rains, the following poem is recited several times:

Even a man who is pure in heart and says his prayers by night, may become a wolf when the wolf-bane blooms and the autumn moon is bright.

In the 1943 French novel Our Lady of the Flowers, the boy Culafroy eats "Napel aconite", so that the "Renaissance would take possession of the child through the mouth."

Aconite and wolfsbane have also appeared in a references in modern settings. In the early 1980s, famed Spanish horror film star Paul Naschy named his production company "Aconito Films", an in-joke relating to the large number of werewolf movies he produced. In the 2003 Korean television series Dae Jang Geum, set in the 15th and 16th centuries, Choi put "wolf's bane" in the previous queen's food.

In the 1980 novel Monk's-Hood, third in Ellis Peters' series The Cadfael Chronicles and set in 1138, a wealthy donator to Shrewsbury Abbey, Gervase Bonel, is murdered with stolen Monks-hood liniment prepared by the Abbey's herbalist Brother Cadfael, who needs to identify the true culprit to exonerate Bonel's stepson Edwin.

In the Harry Potter series by J.K. Rowling, describing aconitum is one of three questions that Professor Snape asks Harry Potter during his first Potions class in the first novel. Snape's preparations of the drug as a treatment for lycanthropy are also an important plot point in the third novel.

In the TV series Dexter, serial killer Hannah McKay (a love interest of protagonist Dexter Morgan) has a history of using aconite to murder her victims.

This family of poisons makes a showing in S. M. Stirling's 2000 science fiction novel, On the Oceans of Eternity, where a renegade warlord is poisoned with aconite-laced food by his own chief of internal security. In the 2000s television show Merlin, the titular character attempts to poison Arthur with aconite while under a spell.

In the 2010s TV series Forever, Dr. Henry Morgan identifies the plants in the villain's greenhouse as specifically Aconitum variegatum, which he has used to create a poison to release into the ventilation system of Grand Central Terminal. In the television series Game of Thrones (2011–2019), a Tywin Lannister's commander is assassinated by a dart, identified by Tywin as "Wolf's Bane" due to its scent. In the second season of the BBC drama Shakespeare and Hatherway, episode 9, a tennis player is poisoned through the skin of his palm by aconite smeared on the handle of his racquet.

In the popular 2020 game Ghost of Tsushima, Jin Sakai uses aconite as a weapon against the Mongol army. The player can craft a poison using aconite plants found around the game map.

In the third season of "You," Love Quinn murders her first husband, James, after injecting him with Aconite after James asked for a divorce. Love admits to Joe (the protagonist) that she killed James "accidentally" and then tells Joe she poisoned him with Aconite through skin contact after he grabbed a knife to protect himself after he asks Love for a divorce. When Love approaches Joe (who is believed to be dying from Aconite and is "paralyzed"), he stabs her with a needle with his own mixture he created from Love's Aconite substance. Joe tells Love, while she is paralyzed, that he knew what was growing in their backyard and tells her, "You did this to yourself."

In the 2024 Netflix thriller Carry-On, the Traveller (played by Jason Bateman) murders some of his targets by poisoning them with aconitum.

=== In mysticism ===
Wolf's bane is used as an analogy for the power of divine communion in Liber 65 1:13–16, one of Aleister Crowley's Holy Books of Thelema. Wolf's bane is mentioned in one verse of Lady Gwen Thompson's 1974 poem "Rede of the Wiccae", a long version of the Wiccan Rede: "Widdershins go when Moon doth wane, And the werewolves howl by the dread wolfsbane."

== Gallery ==
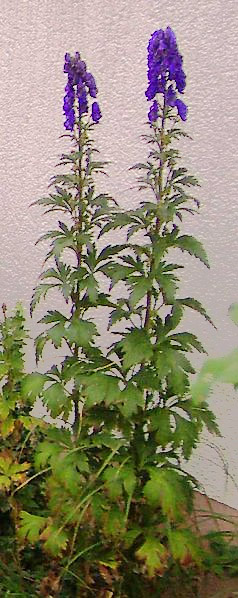
Aconitum napellus

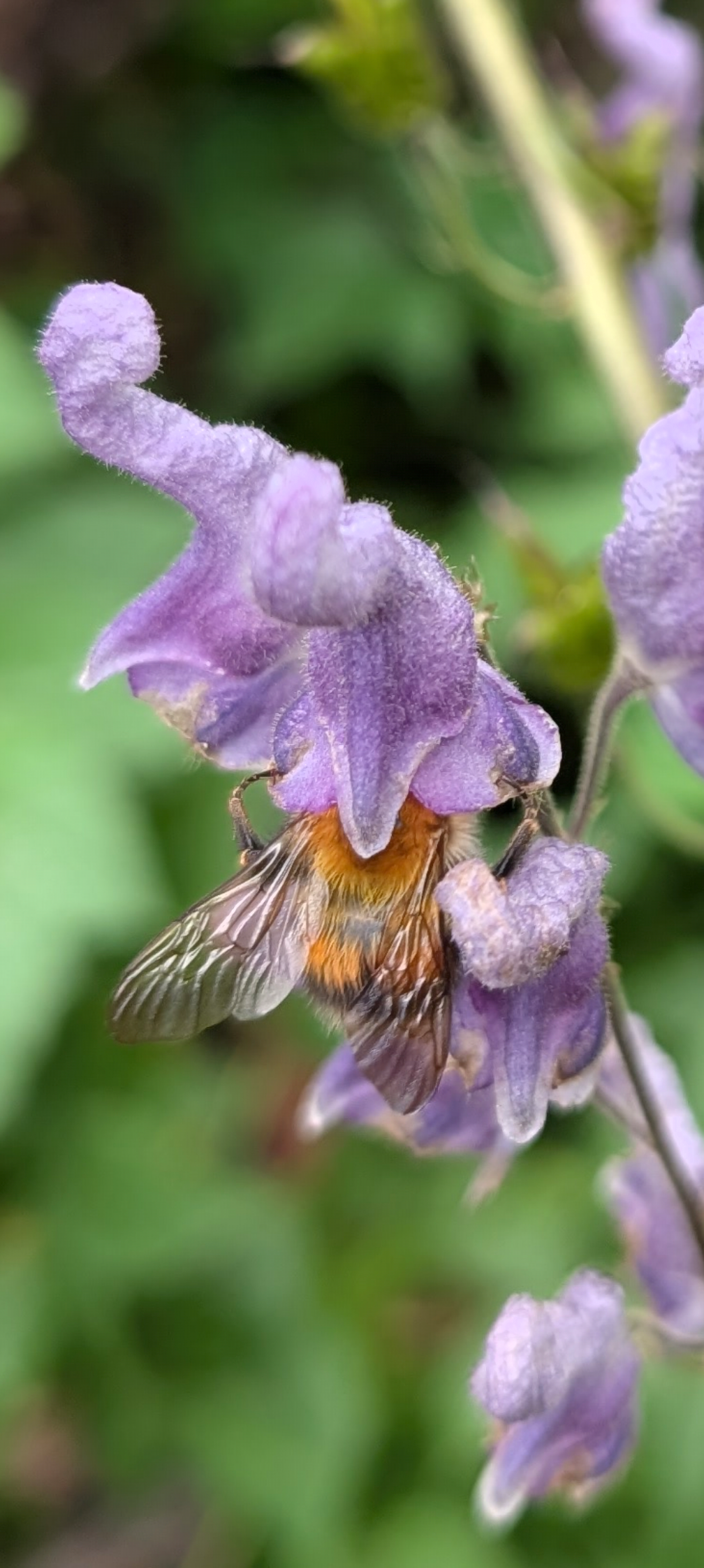
Aconitum species undergoing pollination in Xinjiang, China

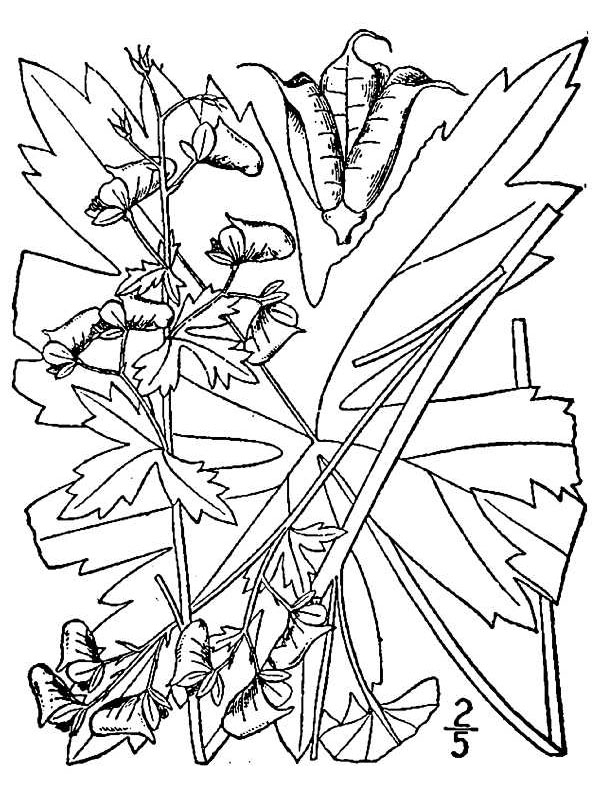
Trailing white monkshood (A. reclinatum)

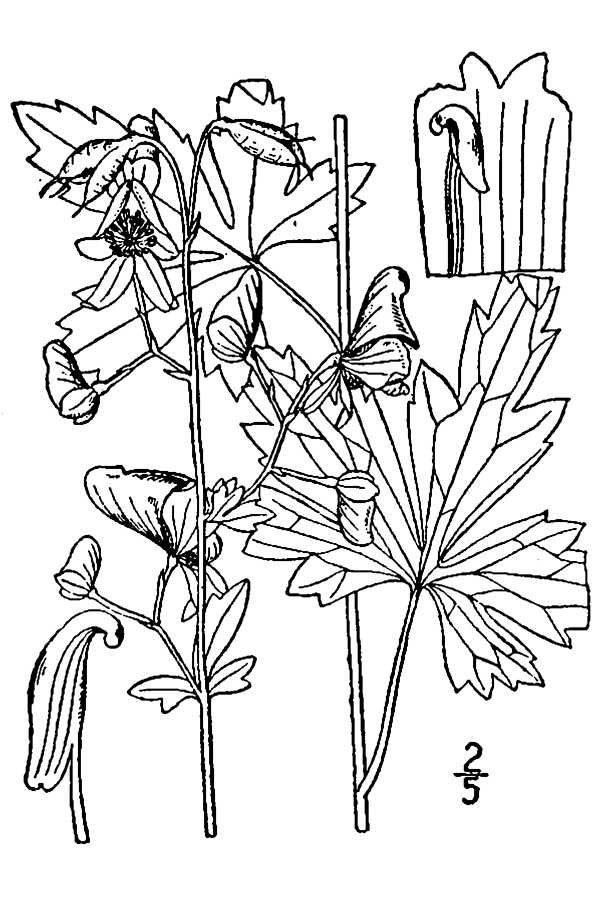
Southern blue monkshood (A. uncinatum)

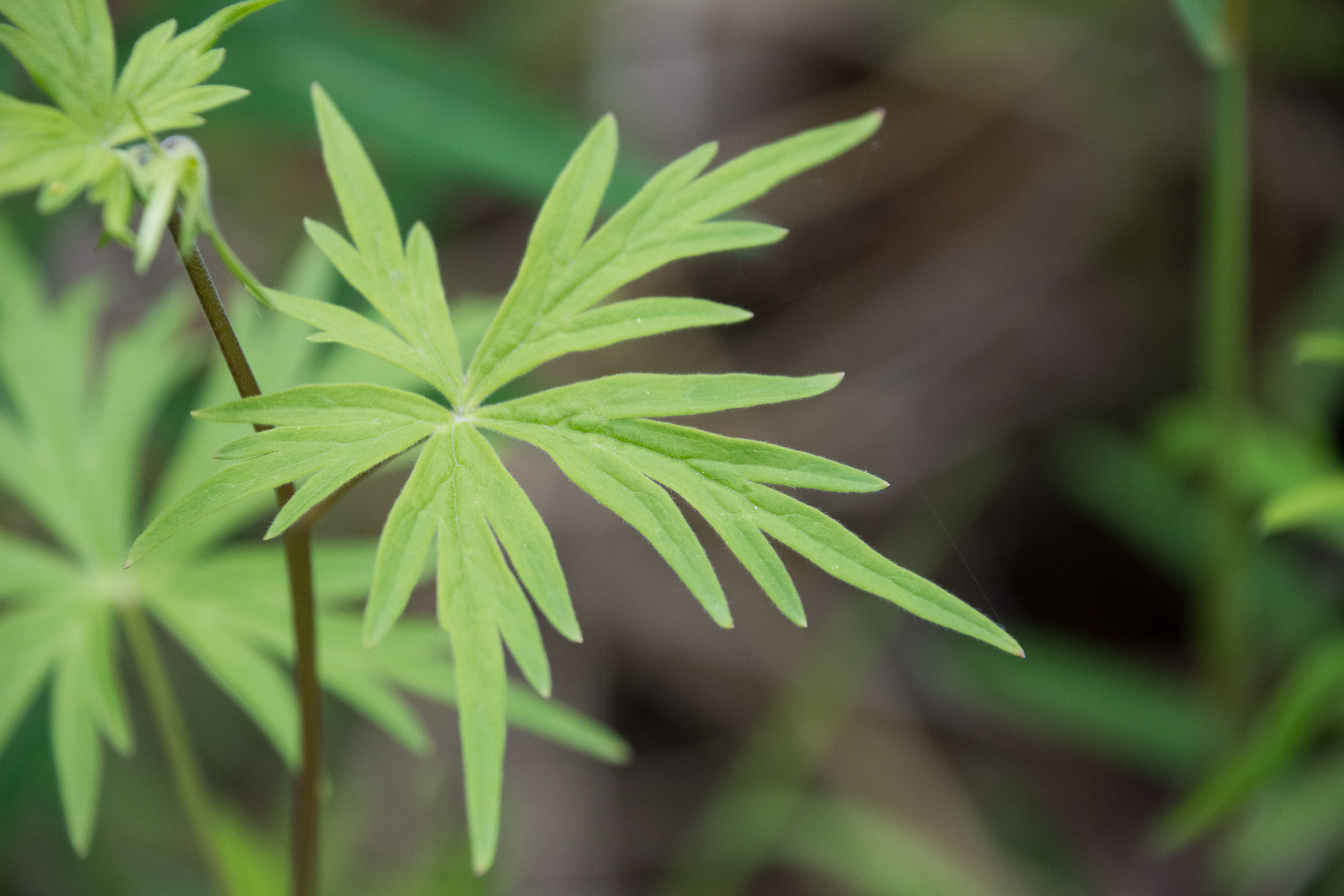
Wild Alaskan monkshood (A. delphinifolium) is a flowering species that belongs to the family Ranunculaceae. The picture was taken in Kenai National Wildlife Refuge in Alaska.

== See also ==
- Rufus T. Bush, industrial tycoon who died of accidental aconite poisoning
