= Aconitum violaceum =

Conservation status
- Vulnerable (IUCN 3.1)

Scientific classification
- Kingdom: Plantae
- Clade: Tracheophytes
- Clade: Angiosperms
- Clade: Eudicots
- Order: Ranunculales
- Family: Ranunculaceae
- Genus: Aconitum
- Species: A. violaceum

Binomial name
- Aconitum violaceum Jacquem. ex Stapf

Species of plant

Aconitum violaceum is a species of perennial plant distributed in the Himalayan region of India, Pakistan, and Nepal. Within India, it has been recorded in the alpine slopes in an altitude range of 3,600–4,800 m (12,000–16,000 ft). The plant is used in traditional Tibetan medicine. It has a bitter taste and a cooling tendency.
