= Aconitum sukaczevii =

Scientific classification
- Kingdom: Plantae
- Clade: Embryophytes
- Clade: Tracheophytes
- Clade: Spermatophytes
- Clade: Angiosperms
- Clade: Eudicots
- Order: Ranunculales
- Family: Ranunculaceae
- Genus: Aconitum
- Species: A. sukaczevii

Binomial name
- Aconitum sukaczevii Steinb.

Species of flowering plant

Aconitum sukaczevii is a species of flowering plant in the family Ranunculaceae, native to Irkutsk Oblast in Russia. It is known only from the northern slopes of the Khamar-Daban mountains.
