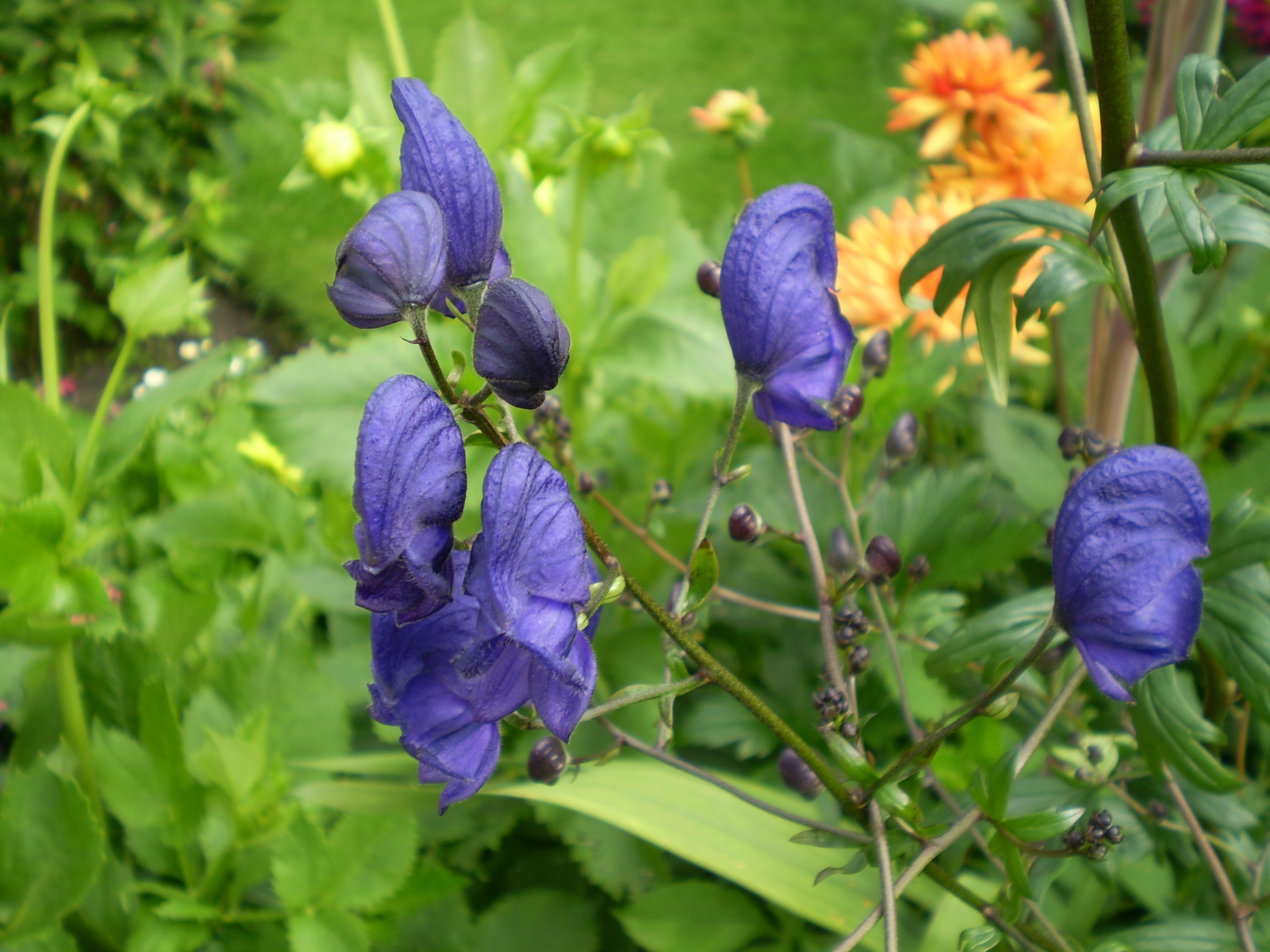
- Aconitum henryi, inflorescence

Scientific classification
- Kingdom: Plantae
- Clade: Tracheophytes
- Clade: Angiosperms
- Clade: Eudicots
- Order: Ranunculales
- Family: Ranunculaceae
- Genus: Aconitum
- Species: A. henryi

Binomial name
- Aconitum henryi E. Pritz.

Synonyms
- Aconitum lioui Aconitum shensiense Aconitum sungpanense

= Aconitum henryi =

Species of plant

Aconitum henryi is a species of flowering plant in the buttercup family known by the common name Sparks variety monkshood.

== Description ==
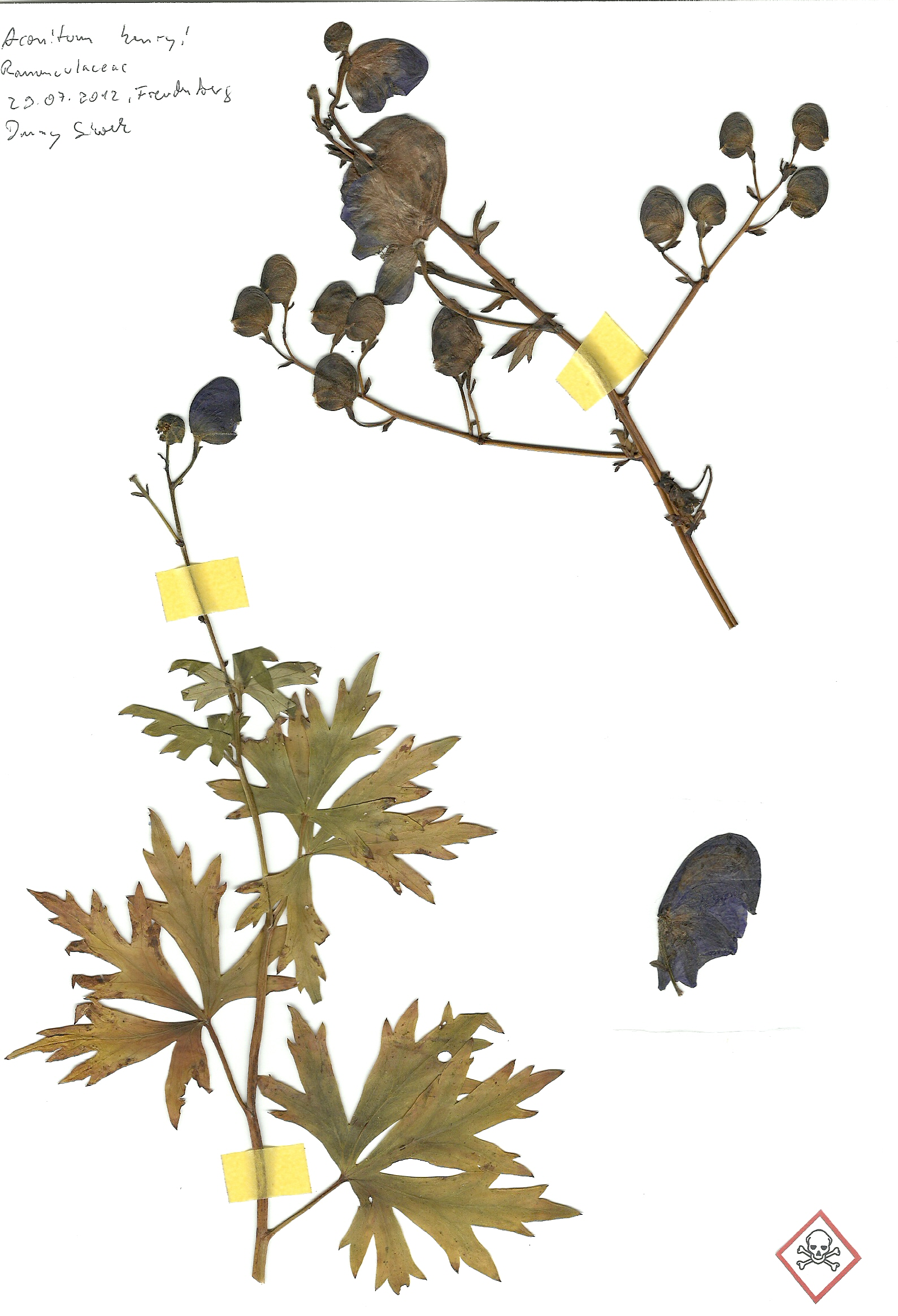
herbarium specimen (cultivar)

Aconitum henryi is a tall (up to 1.5 m (4 ft 11 in) tall), spindly, erect perennial which grows from rhizomes. It has glossy dark green divided leaves, the surfaces are glabrous or adaxially sparsely appressed pubescent. The stem is long with far-spaced flowers. The sepals are blue or deep violet-blue. The flowering period extends over the months of September and October. The fruits are pod-like follicles. Aconitum henryi is poisonous due to the presence of alkaloids.

This species is often cultivated. There are different varieties.

== Taxonomy ==
It was found in China and then first described and published by German botanist Ernst Georg Pritzel in Bot. Jahrb. Syst. (Botanische Jahrbücher für Systematik) Vol.29 on page 329 in 1900.

It was verified by United States Department of Agriculture and the Agricultural Research Service on 18 February 1998.

== Distribution ==
This wildflower is native to China, (within the provinces of Gansu, Henan, Hubei, Hunan, Shaanxi, Shanxi, Sichuan and Zhejiang) where it grows in forests and scrubs in mountainous areas (1,000–3,100 m (3,300–10,200 ft) above sea level).

== Conservation ==
It is considered a plant of least concern on the 'Asia Red List' of plants based on the IUCN Red List.
