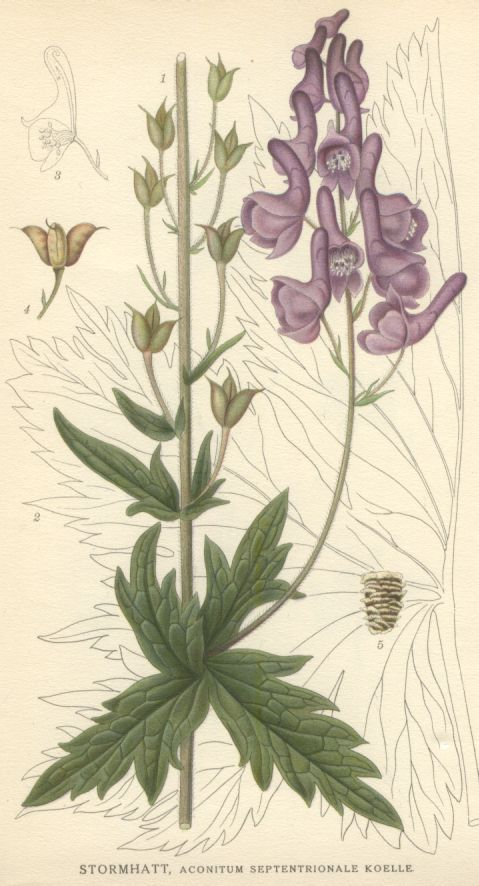

Scientific classification
- Kingdom: Plantae
- Clade: Embryophytes
- Clade: Tracheophytes
- Clade: Spermatophytes
- Clade: Angiosperms
- Clade: Eudicots
- Order: Ranunculales
- Family: Ranunculaceae
- Genus: Aconitum
- Species: A. lycoctonum

Binomial name
- Aconitum lycoctonum L.

Synonyms
- List: Aconitum aegophonum Rchb.; Aconitum alienum Rchb.; Aconitum altissimum Mill.; Aconitum altissimum subsp. penninum (Ser.) Holub; Aconitum artophonum Rchb.; Aconitum australe Rchb.; Aconitum baumgartenii Schur; Aconitum cynoctonum Rchb.; Aconitum galeriflorum Stokes; Aconitum jacquinianum Host; Aconitum lagoctonum Rchb.; Aconitum luparia Rchb.; Aconitum lupicida Rchb.; Aconitum meloctonum Rchb.; Aconitum monanense F.W.Schmidt ex Rchb.; Aconitum myoctonum Rchb.; Aconitum perniciosum Rchb.; Aconitum pyrenaicum L.; Aconitum rectum Bernh. ex Rchb.; Aconitum rogoviczii Wissjul.; Aconitum squarrosum L. ex B.D.Jacks.; Aconitum tenuisectum Schur; Aconitum thelyphonum Rchb.; Aconitum theriophonum Rchb.; Aconitum toxicarium Salisb.; Aconitum transilvanicum Lerchenf. ex Schur; Aconitum umbraticola Schur; Aconitum wraberi Starm.; Delphinium lycoctonum Baill.; Lycoctonum sylvaticum Fourr.

= Aconitum lycoctonum =

Species of plant

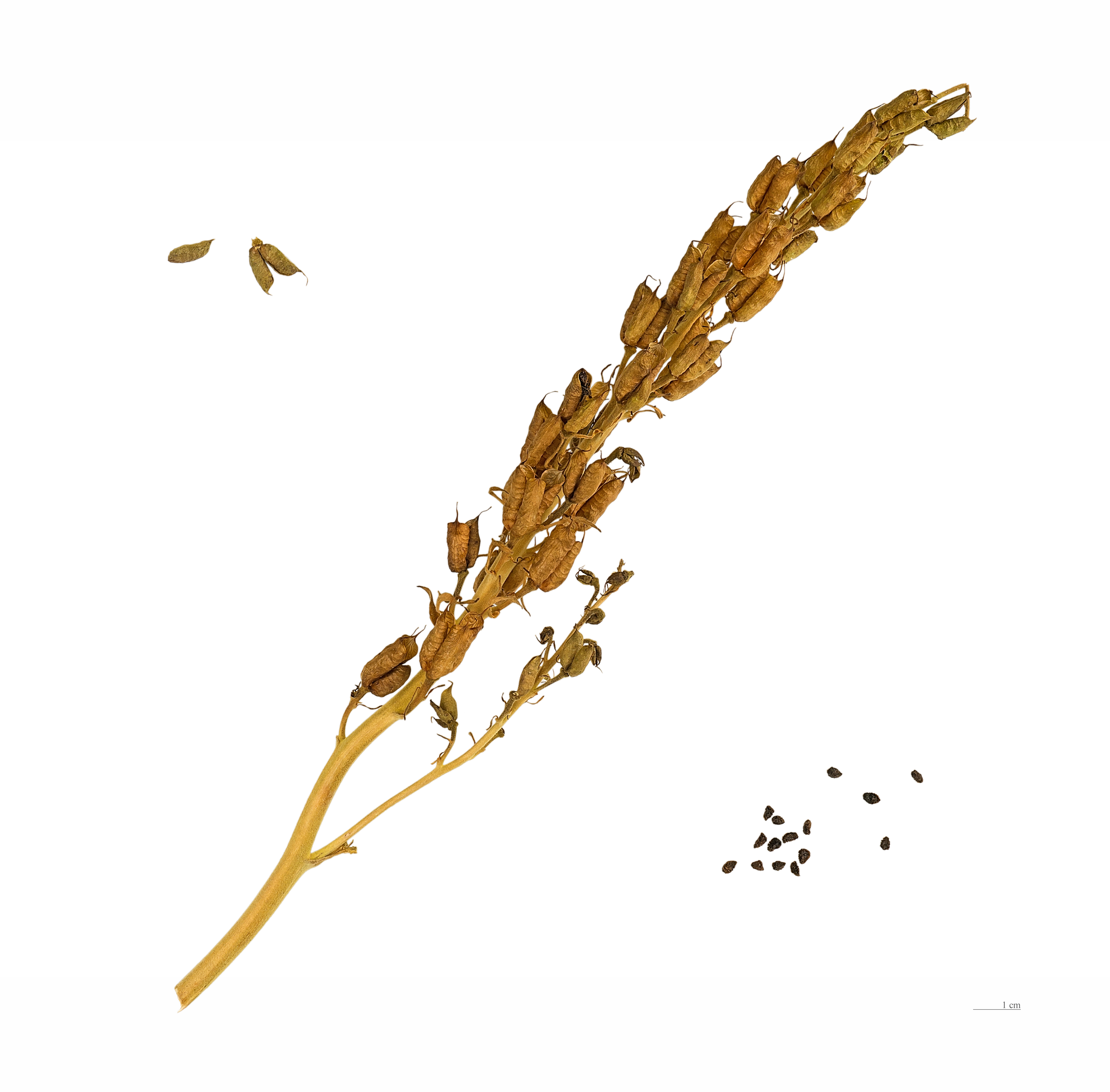
Follicles and seeds

Aconitum lycoctonum (wolf's-bane or northern wolf's-bane) is a species of flowering plant in the genus Aconitum, of the family Ranunculaceae, native to much of Europe and northern Asia. It is found in lowlands to the subalpine zone, mainly in forests and shaded habitats. Along with A. napellus, A. lycoctonum is of the most common European species of the Aconitum genus. They are also grown ornamentally in gardens, thriving well in ordinary garden soil. As such, A. lycoctonum can be found in North America, especially in eastern Canada, often in old gardens or as garden escapees.

Lycoctonum is a rendering in modern Latin of the traditional name "wolf's-bane". Aconitum lycoctonum's name was given by Carl Linnaeus, who found A. lycotonum growing in Lapland, Finland in 1727.

High morphological variability has been described across specimens of A. lycoctonum, however molecular studies showed small genetic distances between populations, and thus A. lycoctonum describes a species complex containing multiple taxa of uncertain taxonomic rank.

It is an herbaceous perennial plant growing to 1 m tall. The leaves are palmately lobed with four to six deeply cut lobes. The flowers are 18–25 mm long, dark violet, rarely pale yellow. Aconitum flowers are five-petaled, zygomorphic, and protandrous. The posterior petal resembles a helmet, hiding two nectaries. In A. lycoctonum, the nectary tips are long and highly curled, conducive to specialized pollination. There are multiple stamens. The ovary is made up of usually three, but up to five free carpels. The fruit are follicles. The herb's inflorescence is a raceme, with maturation occurring from bottom to top. Specimens found in high elevations tend to have more flowers-per-inflorescence and more inflorescences-per-plant than those found in low elevations.

Aconitum is bumblebee-pollinated (genus Bombus). A. lycoctonum is mainly pollinated by Bombus hortorum in the lowlands and Bombus gerstaeckeri in the highlands, both species being long-tongued bumblebees which are able to reach the nectar at the end of the nectaries. The flower's nectar also attract other insects, including flies, and short-tongued bumblebees such as Bombus wurflenii, which act as nectar robbers but may also occasionally pollinate.

Like all species in the genus, it is poisonous. All parts of the plant contain a multitude of alkaloids. These alkaloids act primarily on the muscular endplates. Alkaloids gigactonine, demethylenedelcorine, 14-O-methyldelphinifoline, and pseudokobusine, lycoctonine, lycaconitine, and myoctonine have been isolated from roots and seeds of A. lycoctonum. Gigactonine was found to be the main alkaloid in the flowers, along with 6-Oacetyldemethylenedelcorine (1) and 6-O-acetyl-14-O-methyldelphinifoline, 14- O-methyldelphinifoline, and lycoctonine. The toxicity of alkaloids in A. lycoctonum are much lower than that of A. napellus. Indeed, A. lycoctonum also does not possess the main alkaloid of A. napellus, aconitine, and while A. napellus was used for its antipyretic and analgesic properties until recent times, the medicinal use of A. lycoctonum seems to have become obsolete far earlier, accounts of its use being limited to those to be found in ancient texts.
