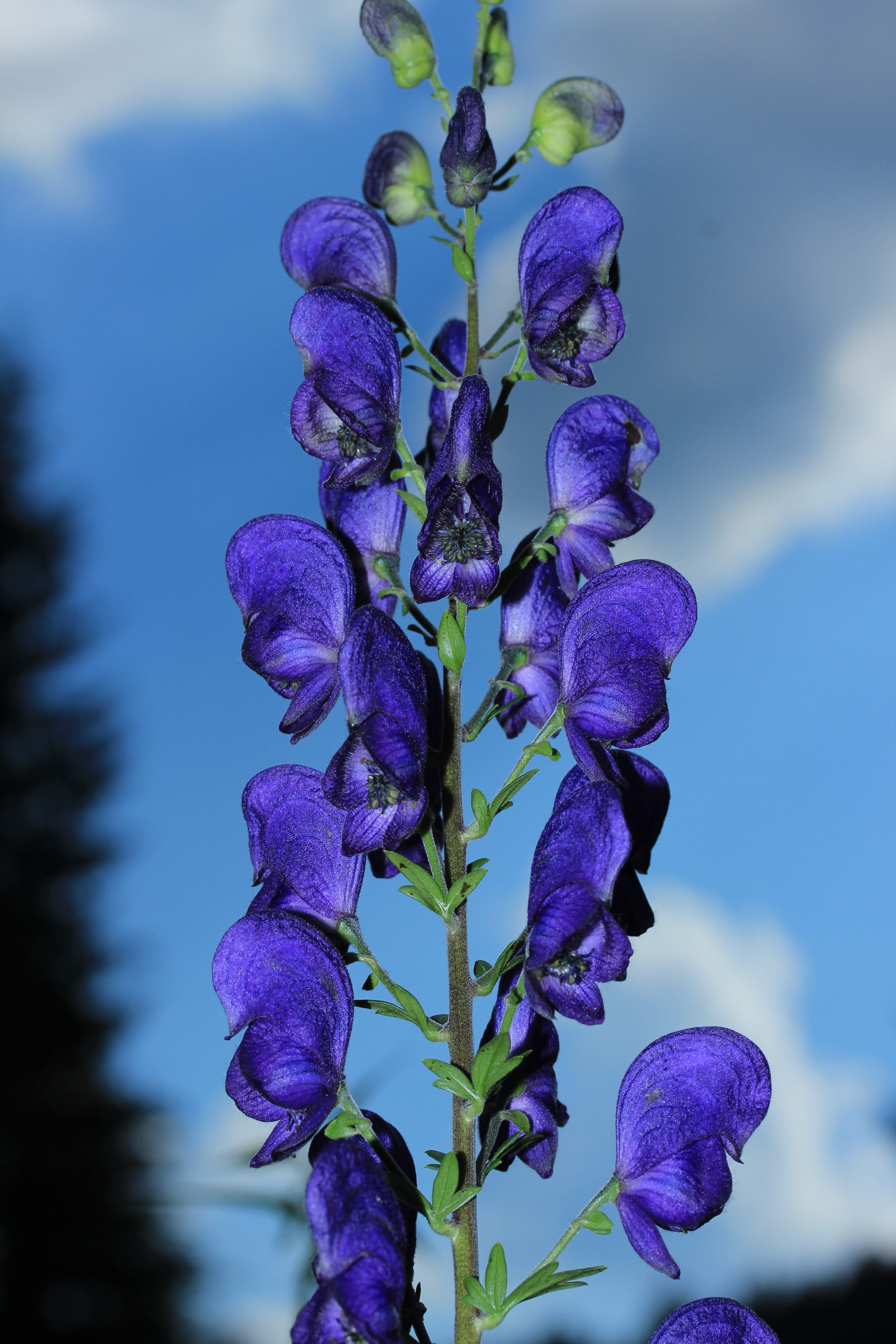

Scientific classification
- Kingdom: Plantae
- Clade: Tracheophytes
- Clade: Angiosperms
- Clade: Eudicots
- Order: Ranunculales
- Family: Ranunculaceae
- Genus: Aconitum
- Species: A. firmum

Binomial name
- Aconitum firmum Rchb.

= Aconitum firmum =

Species of flowering plant

Aconitum firmum (Polish: tojad mocny, Czech: oměj tuhý, Ukrainian: Аконіт міцний, Romanized: Akonіt mіtzniy) is a species of monkshood that is found in Southern Poland, Slovakia, and Czechia, with a few instances in Ukraine and Romania.

== Appearance ==
Aconitum firmum has indigo flowers that are about 2 centimeters big, and can grow up to around 40 centimeters tall.

== Toxicity ==
Like all monkshoods, Aconitum firmum is highly poisonous. All parts of the plant, with the highest concentration being in the roots and seeds, contain aconitine, which is a potent nerve poison.

== Conservation ==
In Poland, Aconitum firmum is a protected species, along with all other monkshood species in Poland. The subspecies A. firmum subsp. moravicum is recognized as Near Threatened by the IUCN Red List, although A. firmum itself has not been evaluated by the IUCN.

== Taxonomy ==
=== Name ===
Aconitum firmum was named by Ludwig Reichenbach in 1819. The species name firmum comes from the inflection of the Latin word firmus, meaning stable and firm. The Czech, Polish, and Ukrainian common names reflect on this and can be literally translated to "strong aconite".

=== Subspecies ===
Aconitum firmum is divided into 6 subspecies and 1 variety which are:

- Aconitum firmum subsp. bucovinense (Zapal.) Aschers. & Graebn.
- Aconitum firmum subsp. firmum
- Aconitum firmum subsp. maninense (Skalický) Starm.
- Aconitum firmum subsp. moravicum V.Skalick
- Aconitum firmum subsp. paxii Starm.
- Aconitum firmum subsp. zapalowiczii Starm.
- Aconitum firmum var. portae-ferratae Starm. & Mitka
