= Raksi =

Nepalese liquor

Raksi रक्सी
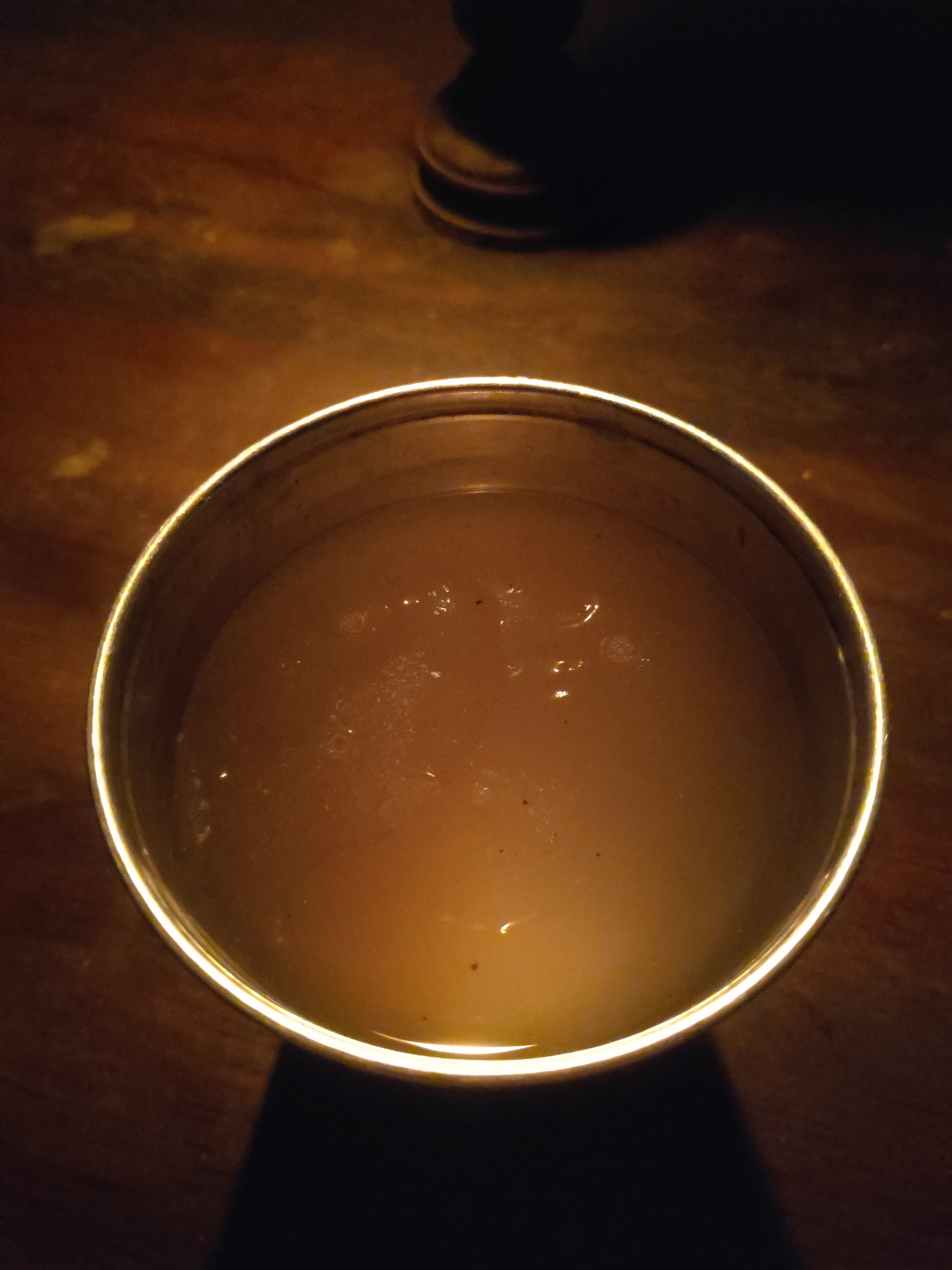
- Raksi in a bowl
- Type: Alcoholic beverage
- Origin: Nepal
- Ingredients: Fermented grains
- Related products: Aila; Chhaang; Tongba

Raksi (Nepali: रक्सी; Bantawa: Hengmawa/Hengma; Newar: Aila; Limbu: Sijongwaa aara) is a traditional alcoholic beverage widely consumed in Nepal. It is a distilled liquor made from fermented grains such as rice, millet, barley, or wheat, and is often prepared using homemade, traditional methods. Raksi holds a deep cultural significance and is commonly consumed by Nepalese people during festivals, rituals, and social gatherings.

Raksi is a strong drink, clear like vodka or gin, tasting somewhat like Japanese sake. It is usually made from kodo millet or rice; different grains produce different flavors. It is made by distilling a chhaang, a brewed alcoholic drink. The Limbus and Kirati people, for whom it is a traditional beverage, drink tongba and raksi served with pieces of pork, water buffalo or goat meat sekuwa. For the Newars, aila is indispensable during festivals and various religious rituals as libation, prasad or sagan.

In CNN's list of the world's 50 most delicious drinks, raksi was ranked 41st and was described as follows: "made from millet or rice, raksi is strong on the nose and sends a burning sensation straight down your throat that resolves itself into a surprisingly smooth, velvety sensation. Nepalese drink this home brew to celebrate festivals, though some think that the prized drink itself is the reason to celebrate."

Because of its popularity, various temperance movements exist in Nepal, including various women's groups. Raksi, however, remains an important requirement of various religious rituals and social events, due in part perhaps to its antiseptic properties.

GC-MS based metabolomics revealed medicinal compounds present in raksi collected from high altitudes of Singalila Ridge of the Himalayas. Study claims raksi contains compounds that are useful as a remedy of high-altitude sickness.

== Serving ==
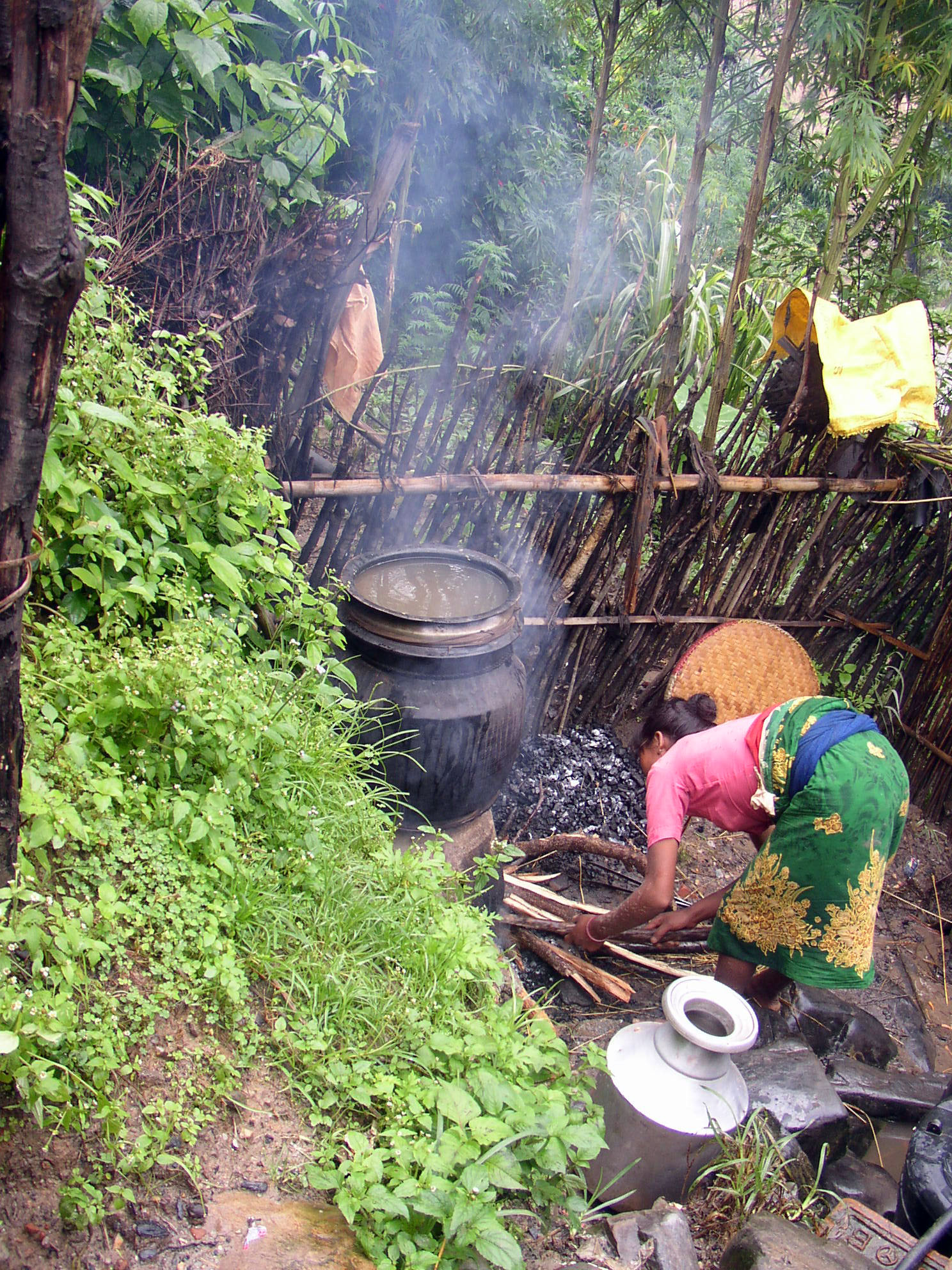
Raksi distillery in Nepal

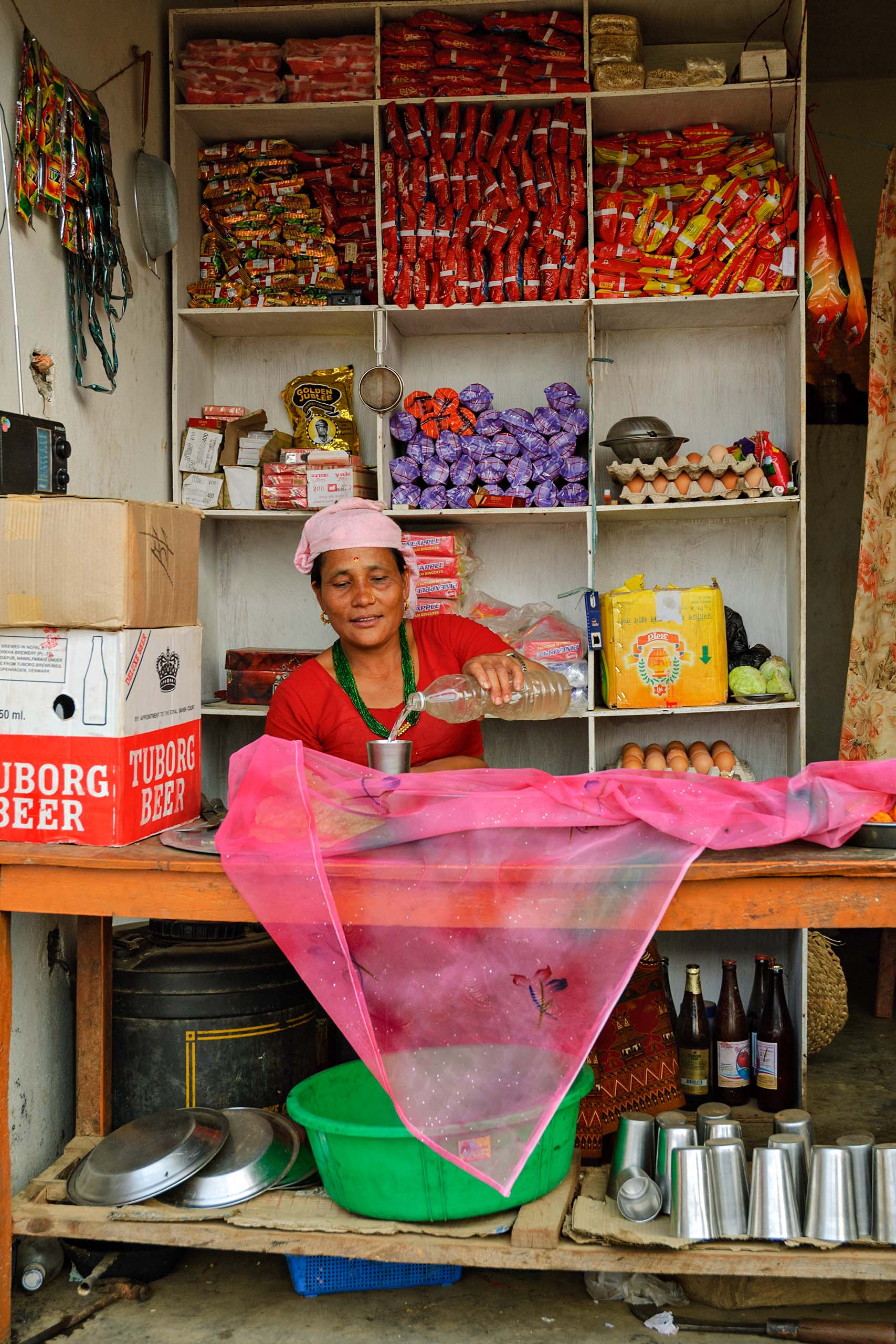
Raksi home-brewed alcoholic drink is served in a small shop, Dhading, Nepal.

Raksi is often served in a bhatti glass'or small steel glass and during special occasions, the drink is poured from a great height via a pitcher with a small spout on Sallicha, making an entertaining spectacle.

== Production ==
Raksi is produced, sold and mostly consumed at rustic distilleries scattered around the countryside. Usually it is not aged before consumption. A large amount of wood is used in the distillation process.

== See also ==
- Alcohol in Nepal
- Nepalese drinks
- Nepalese cuisine
