= Swanti (festival) =

Five-day Newari festival of Nepal

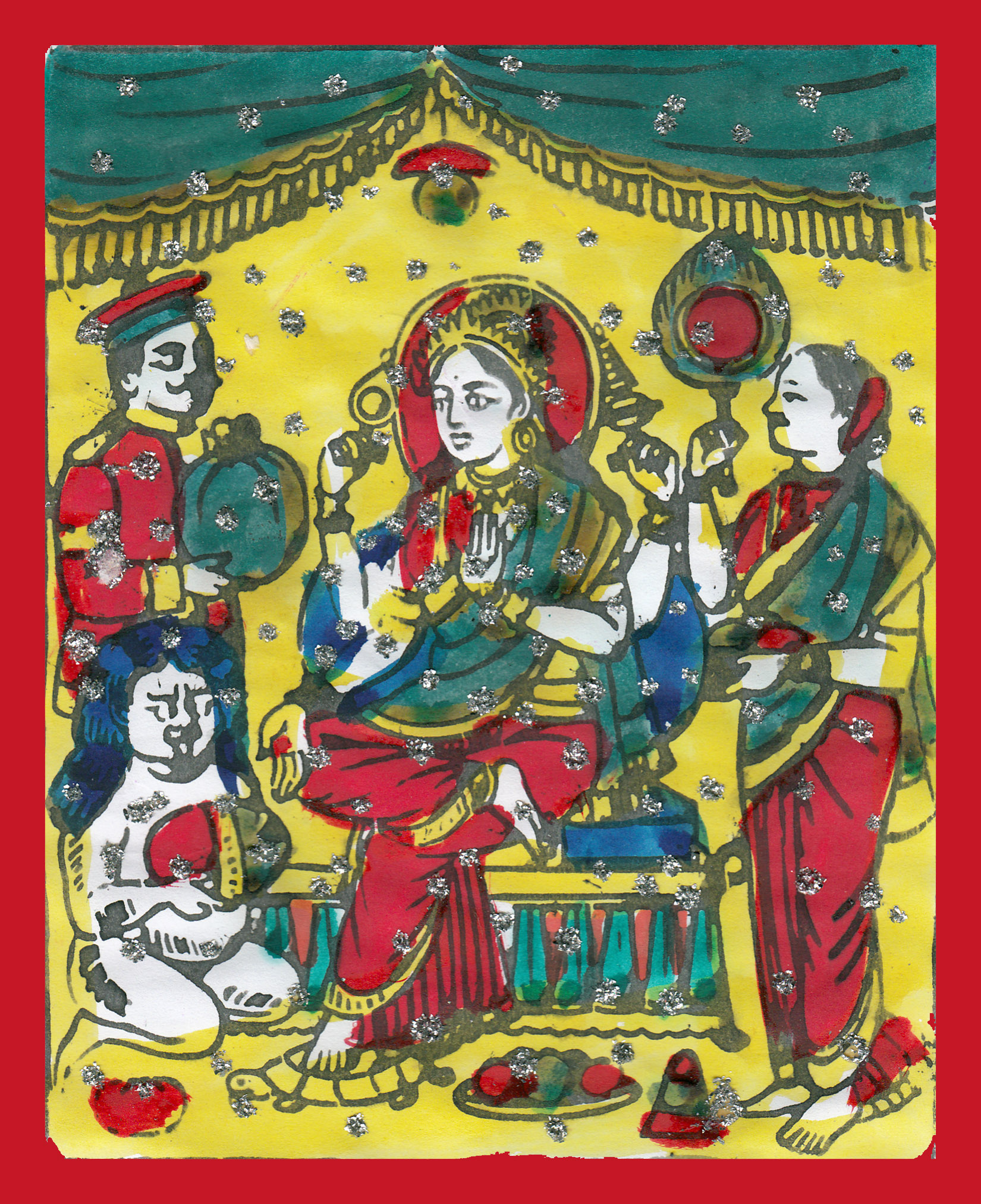
Painting of Goddess Lakshmi

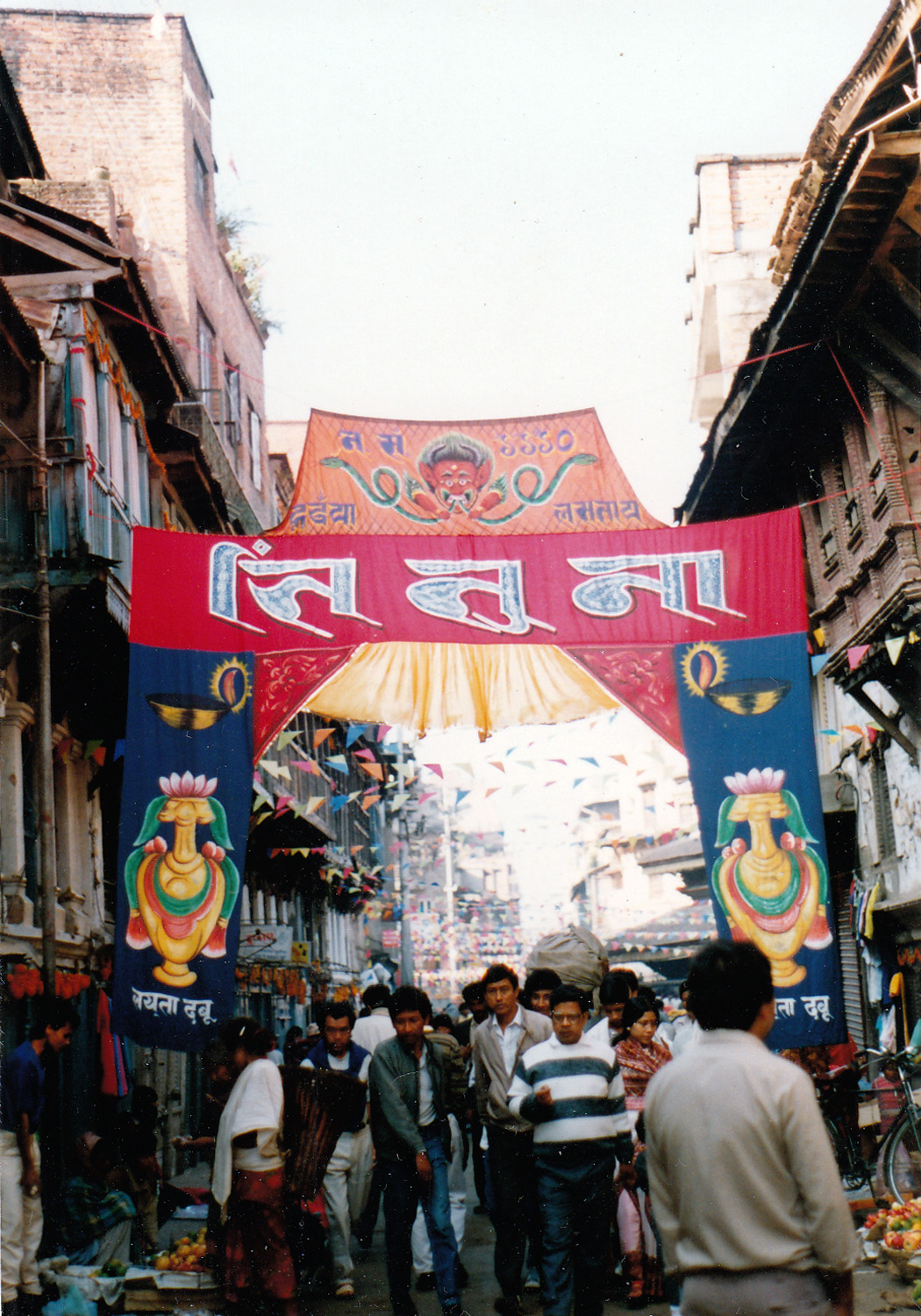
Bunting over a street in Kathmandu saying Bhintuna (best wishes) for the new year

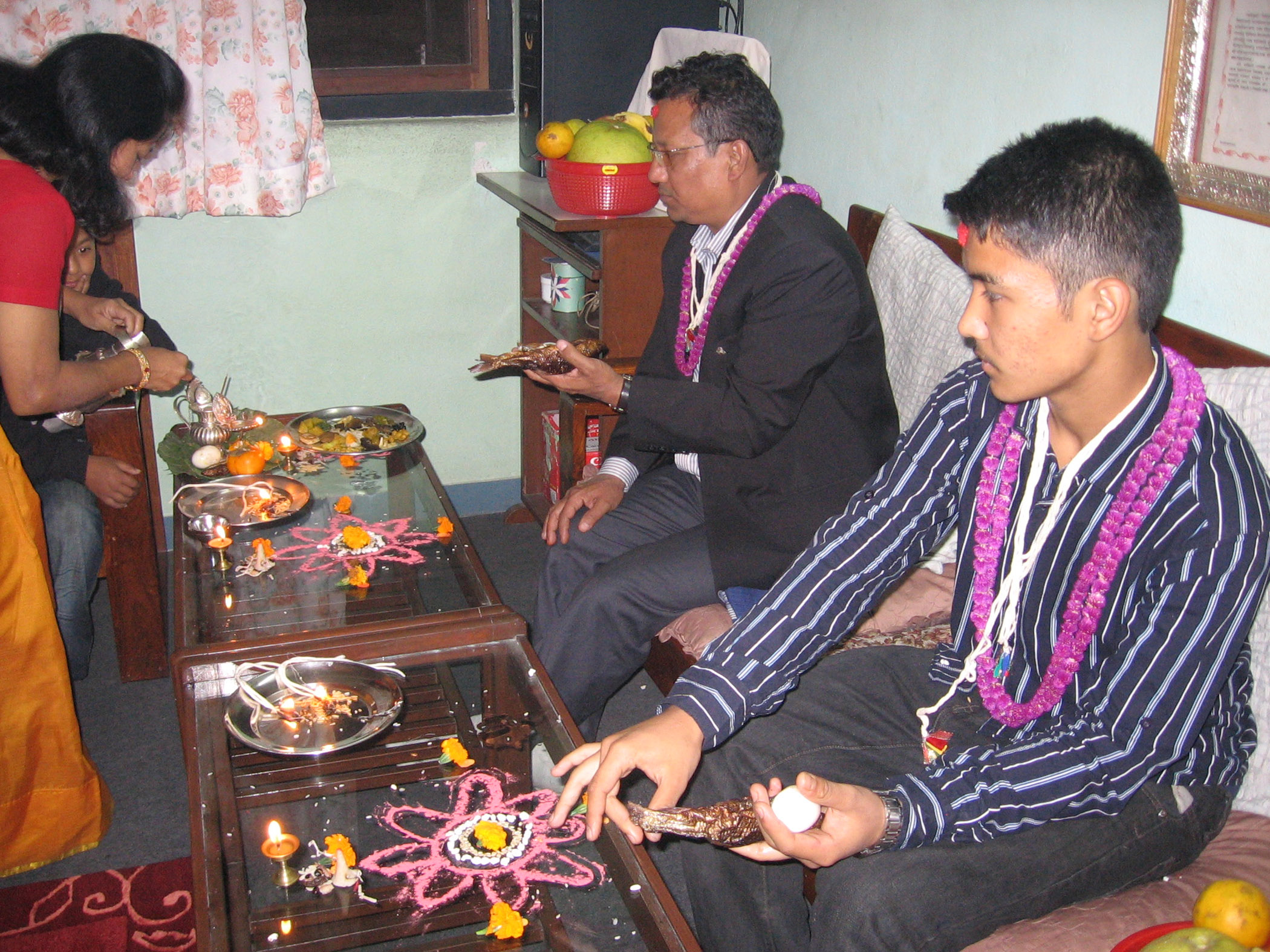
Kija Puja being performed with mandala

Swanti (Devanagari: स्वन्ति, Nepal Script :𑐳𑑂𑐰𑐣𑑂𑐟𑐶) is a five-day festival of Nepal which is one of the year's greatest celebrations for the Newar people. It is the Newar version of Tihar or Diwali. The festival highlights the central role of women in the household, and the rituals are related to wishing for good fortune of the family members by presenting them auspicious items and praying for longevity by placating the god of death.

During the festival, windows and doorways are decorated with flower garlands and lamps. Deities, animals, and people are honored as part of the celebrations. The festival is marked by both Hindus and Buddhists. It is held according to the lunar calendar so the dates are changeable. In 2017, the festival was 17–21 October.

== Lakshmi Pujā ==
The first two days are Kwah Pujā and Khichā Pujā dedicated respectively to crows and dogs, both known as messengers of death. Goodies are left on the roof for the crows to feast upon. People honour dogs by putting a flower garland around their neck and offering them delicacies. The third day is Sā Pujā, the day dedicated to cows. They are believed to lead the spirits of the deceased to the land of the dead.

Also on the third day, householders observe Lakshmi Puja by worshipping Lakshmi, the Goddess of prosperity (Nepal Bhasa: Lakshmi Dyah लक्ष्मी द्य:) (also spelled Laxmi). They paste a new painting of the Goddess at the shrine installed in an inner room and worship her by making a sand painting of a mandala. All the members of the family then offer coins and venerate her. The next day on Mha Puja, a feast known as Thāybhu, which consists of an immense plate piled high with various food items, is offered to the Goddess.

The painting of Goddess Lakshmi in Newar tradition is distinguished by her accessories and attendants. She is shown holding a Jwālā Nhāykan (ज्वाला न्हायकं) (mirror encircled by flames) in her right hand and a Sinhamu (सिन्ह:मू) (powder container covered by a five-tiered parasol) in the left hand. These two ritual objects stand for prosperity and good fortune and are necessary for many ceremonies in Newar society.

The figure of a man holding a sack of money is said to be the lord of wealth Kubera or a rich trader. Hairy creatures known as Khyāh are believed to live in the high Himalaya. In antiquity, merchants travelling to Tibet are said to have encountered them on the snowy passes, and they may be the same as the Yeti.

== Mha Pujā ==
The next day is Mha Puja which means "worship of the self". The ceremony is believed to purify and empower the soul. Mha Puja signifies an auspicious beginning of the New Year of Nepal Sambat, and invokes prosperity and longevity for the participant. The ceremony consists of worshipping one's mandala and presentation of the Sagan, a set of auspicious food items (rice wine, meat, smoked fish, lentil cake and boiled egg) which represent Tantric concepts.

== Kijā Pujā ==
The fifth day of Swanti is known as Kija Puja and is dedicated to brothers. Sisters honor their younger brothers with a ceremony where a mandala similar to the one used for Mha Puja is worshipped. They present them long-burning wicks (khelu itāh खेलु इता:) which are placed next to the mandala, and also sacred threads (kwakha क्वखा) and a basket of fruits (tahsibwa त:सिब्व) symbolizing long life and good fortune.

The sisters then offer Sagan to their brothers which consists of auspicious food items. The five items wine, meat, fish, lentil cake and egg symbolize the five Tantric concepts of light, earth, water, air, and sky respectively. The brothers give gifts of cash and clothes in return. They are then treated to a lavish feast. The ceremony may be held at the sister's home or at the brother's home as per family tradition.

The day after the end of Swanti, parents invite their married daughters to eat their share of the feast presented to Goddess Laxmi during Mha Puja. Each dish on the large plate is divided into small portions so that all the family members get a share. This party concludes the sequence of events.

== See also ==
- Nepal Sambat
- Sagan (ceremony)
- Tihar (festival)
- Diwali
