= Sherpa marriage =

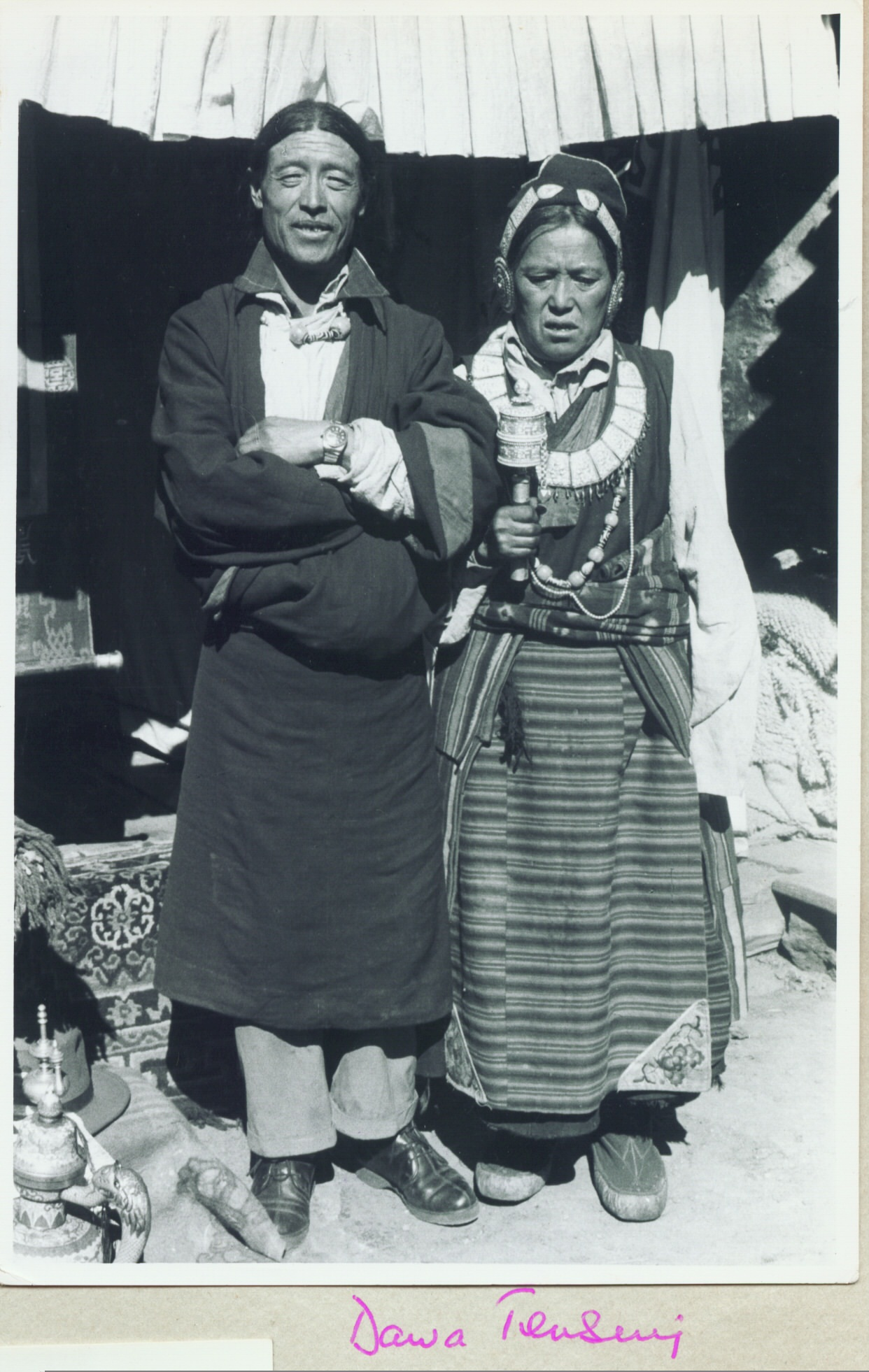
A Sherpa couple in traditional attire.

The Sherpa people, a subgroup of the Tibetans, have their own marriage traditions.

== Proposals ==
Astrological charts are central to all the events leading up to a traditional Sherpa marriage. They are consulted before anything is done. When the prospective groom's family decide to visit the girl's family with the proposition of marriage, they decide an auspicious day by consulting the birth charts of the boy and girl. Sherpa children are assigned an animal at the time of their birth, and these corresponding animals are also matched when a boy and a girl's birth charts are matched. This is done to determine the compatibility of the two people in question. After a day is selected by a lama, the close relatives of the groom (preferably ones whose parents are still alive) accompany him to the girl's house. The boy's parents do not join this party. This ceremony is known as Sodené ('to ask'). The ceremony is a simple offering of a jar of chhaang, the traditional Sherpa barley beer, by the boy's family to the girl's. If the girl's family accept the jar, the marriage proposal is considered accepted. From that day onward, the girl is effectively a member of the boy's family.
