= Alcohol in Nepal =

Alcohol (Raksi or Madira) It is legal to produce up to 60 litres of fermented beverage and distill 30 litres Raksi per year for personal consumption, but it's illegal to sell home-made Raksi spirit in Nepal. The mixed society coupled with caste and multiple ethnic results in an extremely complex social structure which also generally affects alcohol consumption among the people based on their background. There are mainly two types of people in Nepal depending on alcohol use. The group of people who do not drink or use alcohol are called Tagadhari (तगाधारी) (Holy Cord (Janai) Wearer), and the other group who drink alcohol are called Matawali. Traditionally, the Brahmins and Kshatriyas are the Janai wearers and are forbidden from consuming alcohol, with the exception of Matwali Chhetris of Karnali region who are permitted to use alcohol. Alcohol also plays an important role in rituals, festivals and religious ceremonies. Matwalis largely use alcohol for their traditional purposes and generally brew alcohol by themselves. Peoples such as the Tharu, Kirati people, Magar, Gurung, Tamang, and Newars preserve these practices.

== History ==
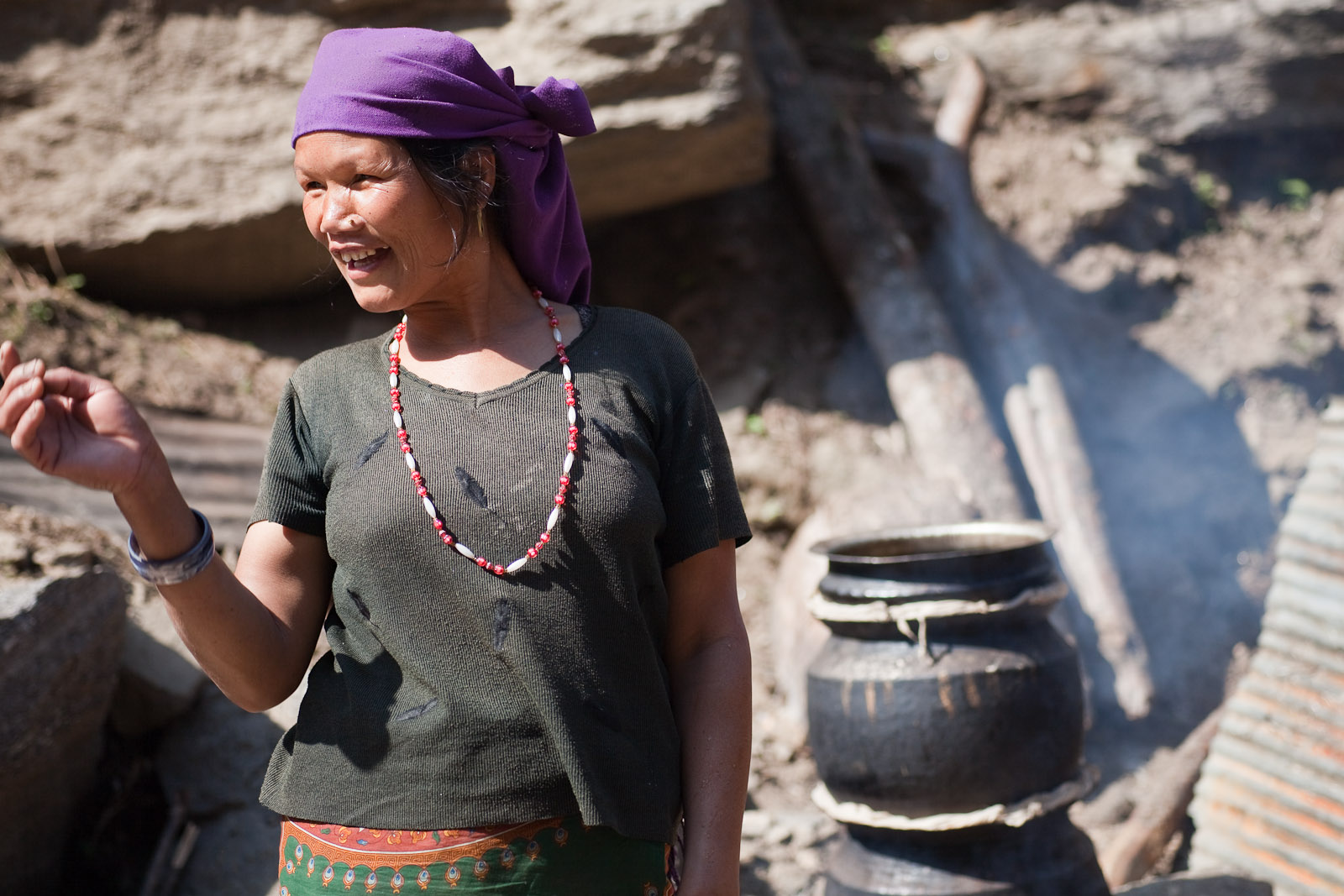
Traditional brewing

In Hindu culture, alcohol is often described as Soma. In the epic of Ramayana and Mahabharata, there are mentions of drinking alcohol by gods and goddesses as a recreational food. In ancient and medieval Nepal, the Kirats, Shakyas, Lichhavis, etc. had already formed a trade relationship with Tibet, India, and China from whence drinking culture probably entered Nepal. The Lele inscription of Shivadeva I and Amshuverma dated 526 AD mentioned alcohol as Paniyagosthi. In the inscription of Jayalambha dated 413 AD, the word Karanapuja is used referring to the alcohol; the inscription was found near Pashupatinath Temple.

== Tradition and religion ==
Alcohol is used for various rituals by various indegeneious communities especially the one influenced by Tantric methods. Some are described below.

=== Sherpas ===
Sherpas use alcohol in marriage and festivals extensively. It is also given to the new mothers as Dejyang. When used as a business settlement, it is called Chhongjyang.

=== Newars ===
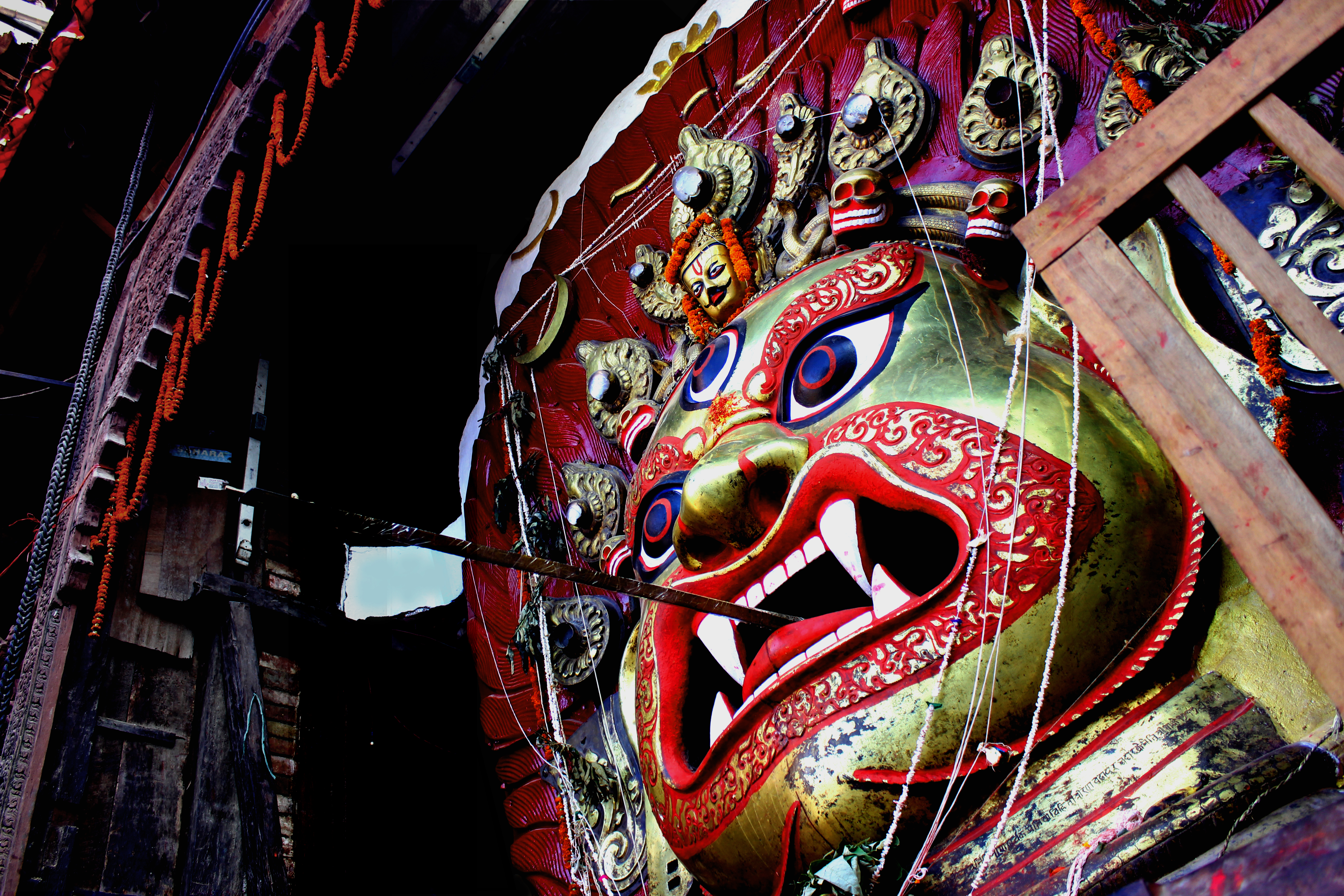
Sweta Bhairab

Ha Thon is a festival to worship Swyeta Bhairab in which the Samayabji and Aila is distributed as the blessing of Bhairab. Alcohol also forms a part of Sagan. In gathering and festival (Bhoj), liquor is generally served by a female.

=== Tharus ===
During the marriage, alcohol is offered to deities called Deuryar. In the hair cutting ritual celebrated in Falgun (February -March), alcohol is offered to deities to accept the ritual's starting. Drinking and dancing are one of the core cultures of Tharus.

=== Kirat ===
In the Kirati community, a marriage proposal is not accepted by the girl's family unless the groom sends them alcohol on three occasions as Sodhani, Multheki and Bhakah. Kirati also use alcohol for various rituals and to worship gods and goddesses.

=== Tamang ===
Groom needs to send 18 or 12 bottles of liquor to bride's house for marriage known as Chukunlah Pong. When someone dies, alcohol is offered to the deceased. The daughter brings alcohol to serve the funeral participants.

=== Magar ===
Couples are not allowed to go to the bride's home after marriage without taking wine and a leg of goat. This is called Duran.

=== Gurung ===
Similar to kirati culture, Gurung family's marriage initiation also starts by sending alcohol to the bride's family by the groom. They also use alcohol as an offering to the deceased person.

=== Limbu ===
Culture of Limbu nationality strongly aheres to giving and accepting various forms of alcohol as gifts and tributes among individuals, clans, priets and elders. ᤋᤥᤱᤒᤠ Tongba which is the indigenous and cultural drink of the Limbus is used in religious ceremony as offering to the gods and in the wedding ceremony as the highest form of respect and honour. ᤙᤧᤈᤥᤱᤘᤠ, Saejongwa in Limbu (Raksi / Distilled alcohol) ranks second highest and mostly used as an offering to honoured guests, as a gift to a relatives and friends or a present to an elder. Finally, ᤌᤡᤡ: (Thhee in Limbu) or (Chhyang / Jaar) is the most commonly used alcohol in a day to day setting as a snack drink or taken for an entertainment or relaxation.

== Types of alcohol ==
- Aila: It is a distilled alcohol. The term Aila is used by Newars, Madh by Tharus and Daru in southern Nepal.
- Raksi: Raksi is a general term to refer to traditionally distilled alcohol.
- Tongba: It is the traditional and indigenous drink of the Limbu people and now used by people of other Kirati communities and many other ethnic group of Nepal. It is home-brewed fermented beer that is drunk by mixing with hot water. It is native to eastern Nepal, Limbuwan.
- Chhaang: It is a sweet-tasting, home-brewed beer by Sherpas. It is also known as Ji by Tamangs, Thon by Newars, Phee by Thakalis, Jand by Gurngs and kiratis, Muna by Majhis and Janra by Tharus.
- Mada: Distilled Spirits in the hilly and Himali region of Eastern Rukum (Nepali: पूर्वी रुकुम)
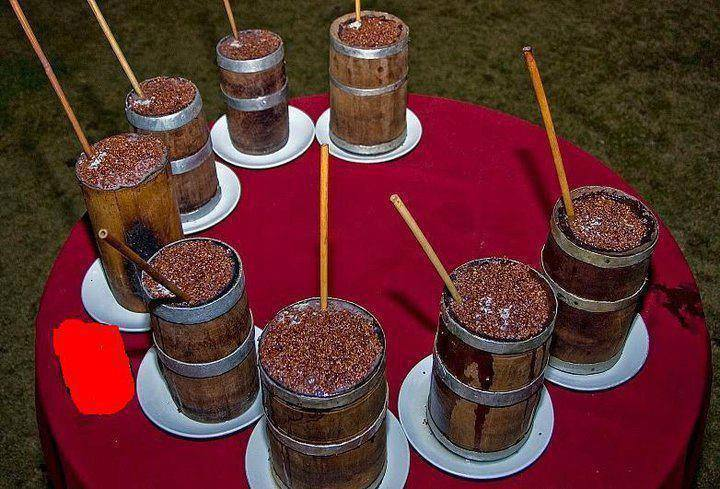
Tongba

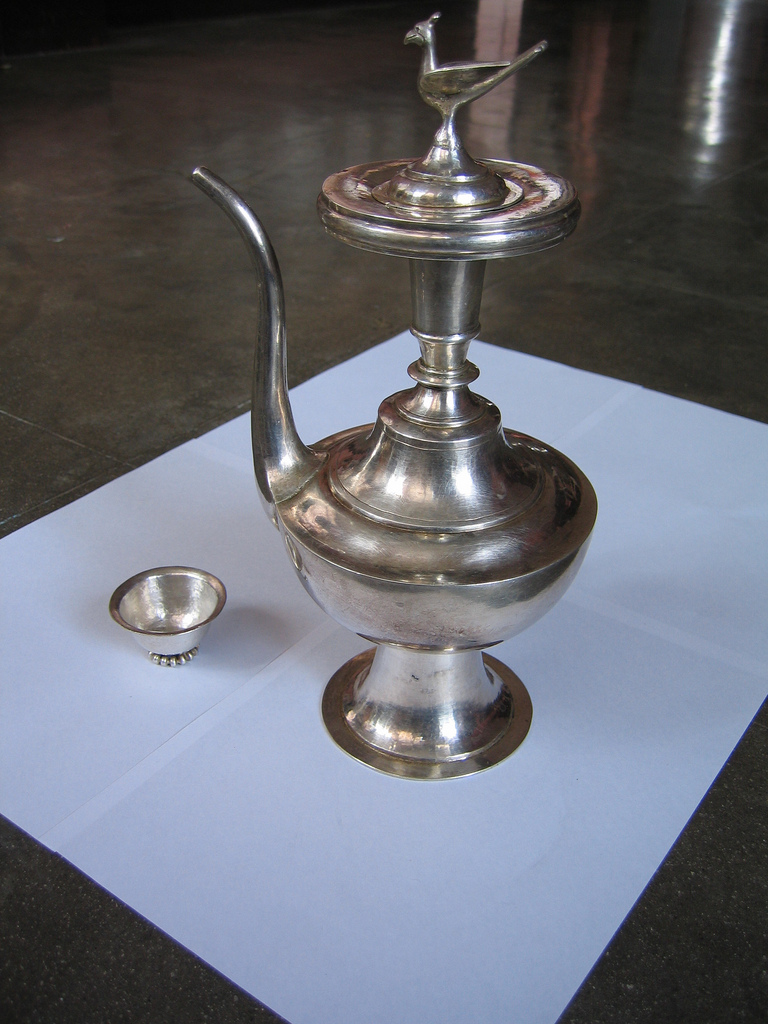
Anti, a vessel in which to keep Aila

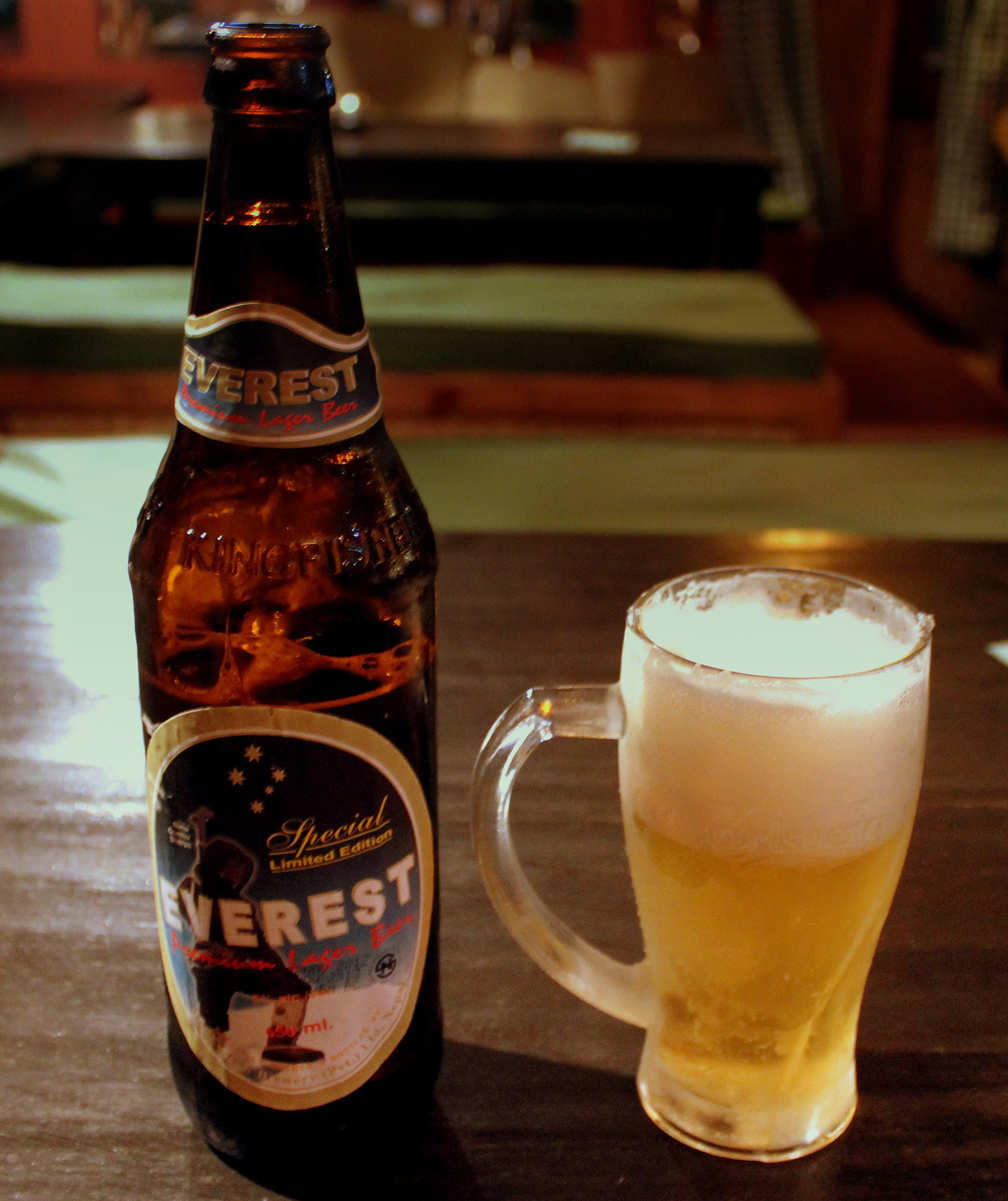
Everest Beer

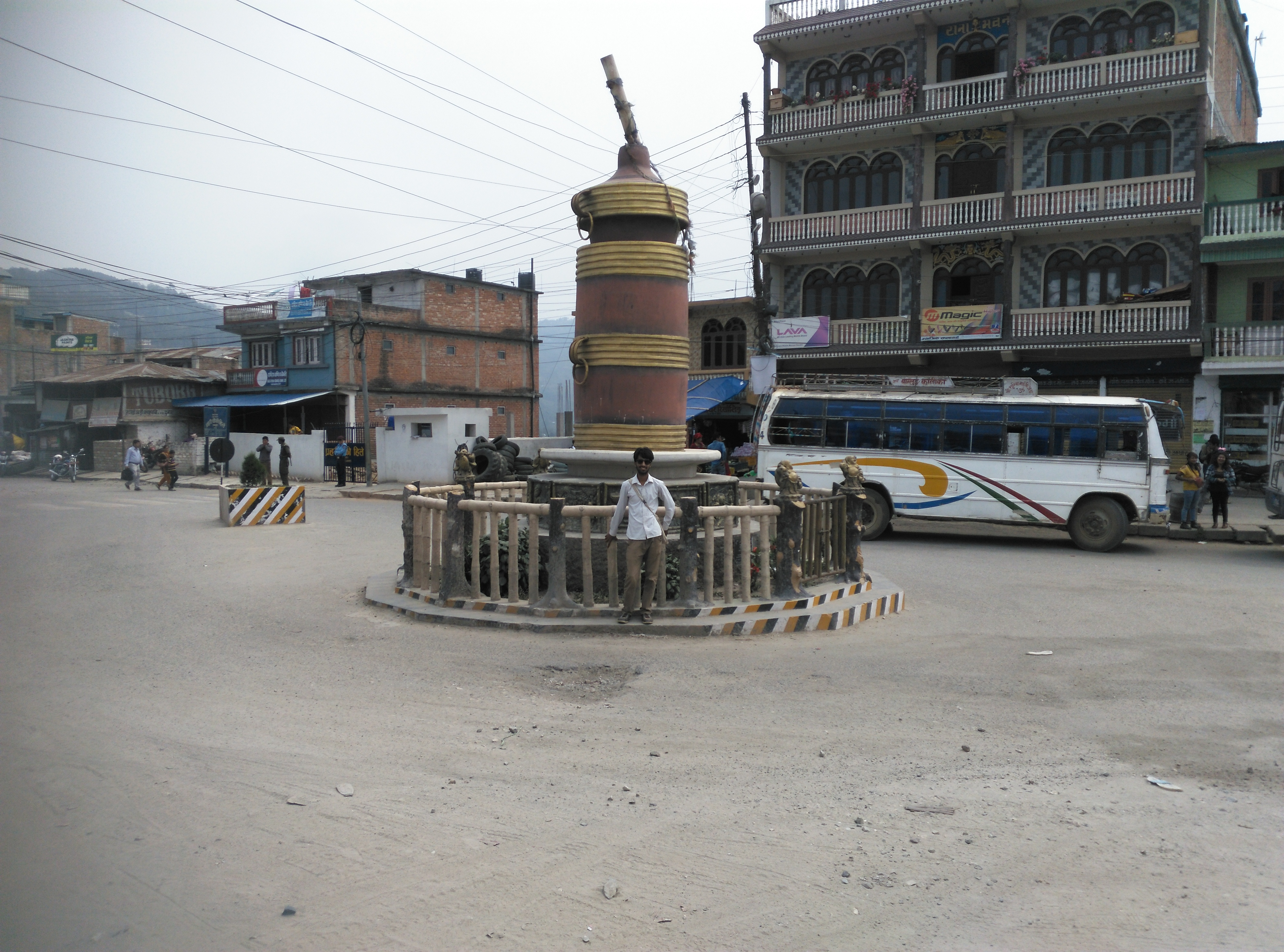
Intersection dedicated to Tongba

== Traditional Breweing ==
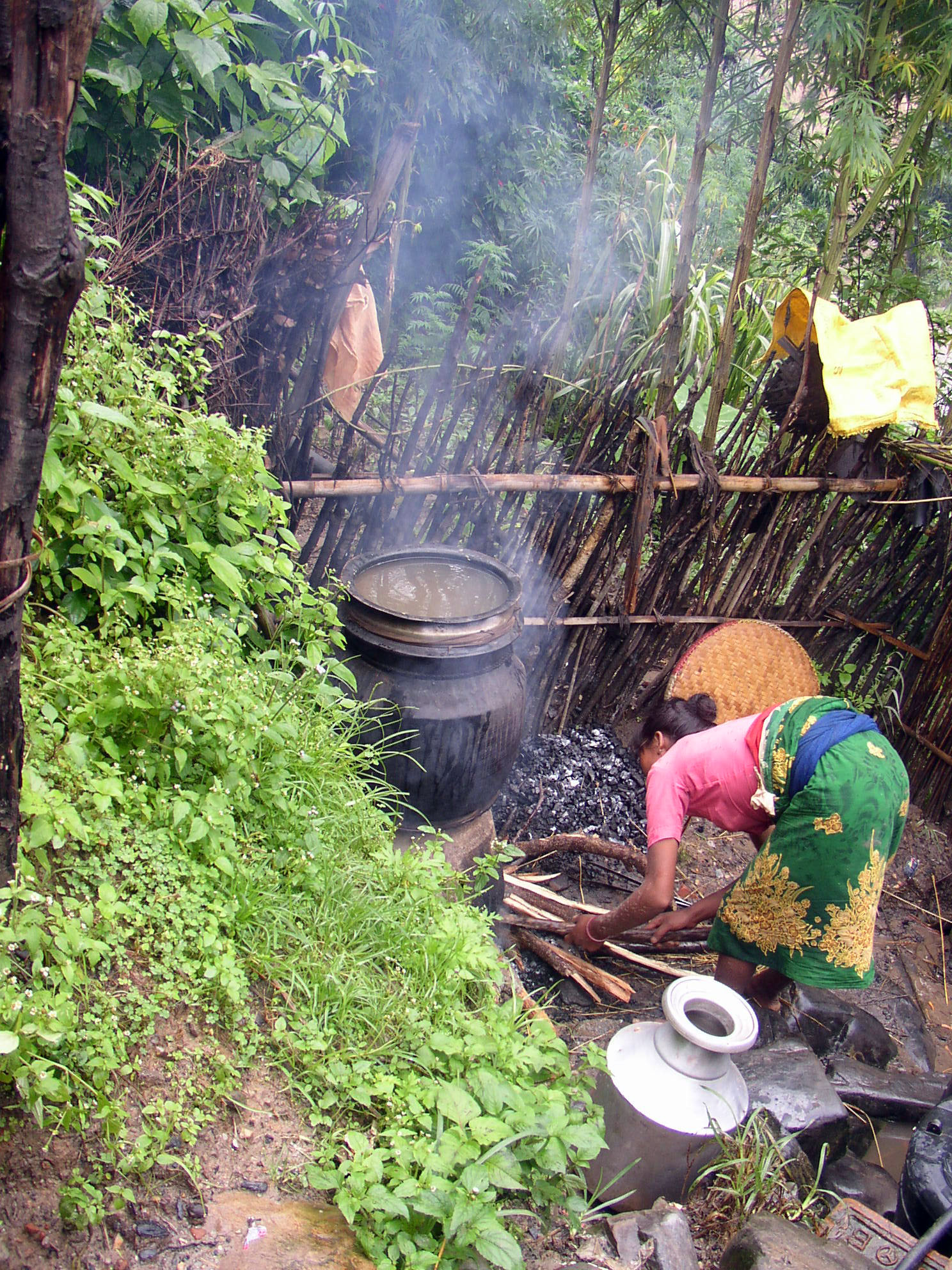
Traditional distilling

== Consumption ==
According to statistics, about 115 kg (254 lb) of rice is used to brew alcohol by Newar families annually, 110 kg by Sherpas, 160 kg by Khumbu and Rolwalingis. Tamang uses 80 kg and 400 kg by Tharus.

=== Industries ===
The alcohol industry is one of the fastest-growing industries in Nepal. There are 36 distilleries in Nepal as of 2000. These factories produce alcoholic drinks with concentrations of 20% to 42.8%. Similarly, commercially-produced beers are brewed with a concentration of 5 to 7% alcohol. The total production capacity is about 42 megaliters per year. Besides, alcohol is also imported from Europe, America and Japan.

== Regulation ==
Production and consumption of alcohol is controlled by the Madira Aain 2031. A licence is required to sell alcohol, but not for brewing and consumption for household purposes.

In 2017, a regulation was passed to set minimum age of 21 for alcohol purchase, regulate time of alcohol sales, require licensing of alcohol outlets and impose a ban on all kinds of alcohol advertisements and promotions. It also includes pictorial warning signs on the label of alcohol bottles.
