= Mha Puja =

Newar festival in Nepal

Mha Pujā
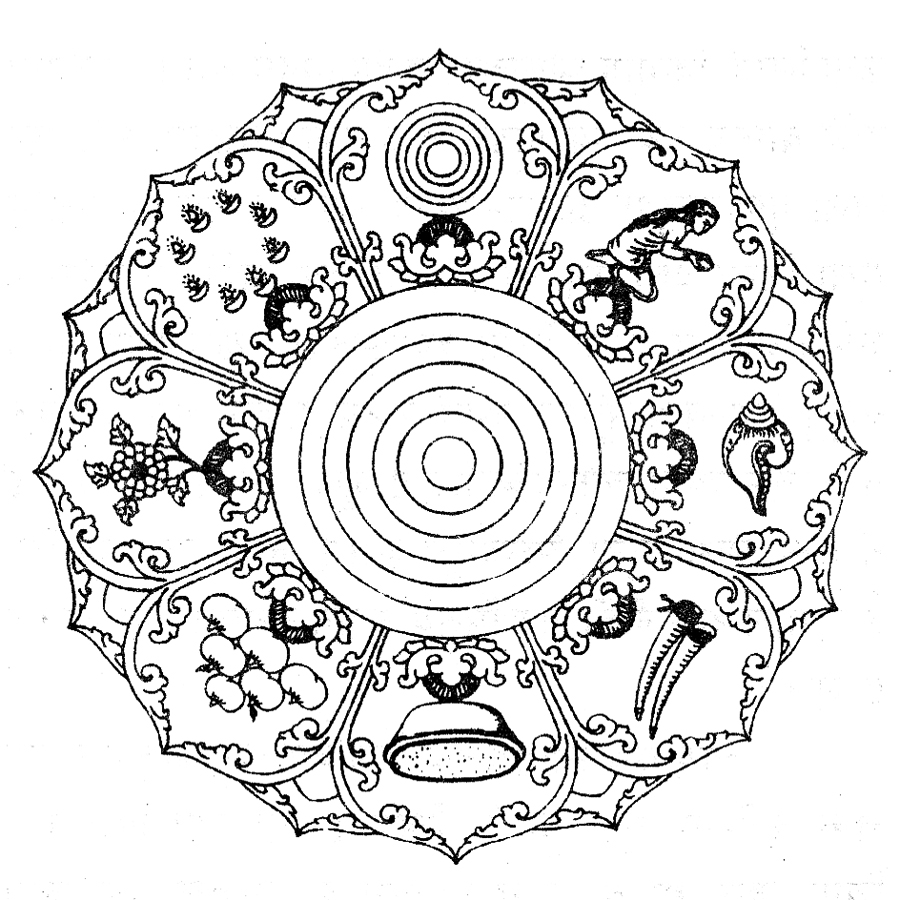
- Sketch of Nepalese Mha Pujā Mandala
- Observed by: Nepalese Hindus and Buddhists
- Type: Religious
- Significance: Spiritual purification for new year
- Celebrations: Mandala worship, ritual gifts presentation, feast
- Date: Kachhala New Moon
- 2026 date: 10 November

Mha Pujā (Newar Script: 𑐴𑑂𑐩𑐥𑐸𑐖𑐵) (Devanagari: म्हपुजा) is an annual ritual performed by the Newar people of Nepal to purify and empower the soul as part of New Year celebrations. It is performed on New Year's Day of Nepal Sambat, the national lunar calendar of Nepal, which occurs during the Swanti festival.

Mha Puja, meaning "worship of the self" in Newari, celebrates the spirit within oneself. The ceremony signifies an auspicious beginning of the New Year, and invokes prosperity and longevity for the participant. Mha Puja and Nepal Sambat are also observed by Nepali diaspora settled abroad.

== The ceremony ==
A row of mandalas (sandpainting of a sacred circular diagram) are drawn on the floor for each member of the family. Extra mandalas are drawn at the end of the row for the two messengers of death. Mandalas are also drawn for essential household items like water pitcher, winnowing tray and broom. The mandala is worshipped by making offerings of ritual food, sacred thread, colored paste, incense, lighted wicks and flowers.

Family members then sit cross-legged in front of one's mandala, and the lady of the household walks down the row putting Tika (a dab of colored paste) on their forehead. She then presents each member an extra long burning wick (khelu itāh खेलु इता:) which is placed next to the mandala. She also gives them sacred threads (kwakha क्वखा) and a basket of fruits including citron (tahsibwa त:सिब्व) symbolizing long life and good fortune.

The next part of the ceremony is Sagan Biyegu (सगं बियेगु). One of the women walks down the line holding a clay pot containing Dhau (yogurt) from which everybody takes a dab and puts it on one's temple. The participants are then presented a set of auspicious ritual food consisting of boiled egg, smoked fish and rice wine. The rice wine is poured in a little bowl and refilled three times, until when the bowl must be held in the hand and not set down.

The worship of the mandala is the principal ritual during Mha Puja. The mandala represents the universe, and the wick and incense stick which are lighted during the ceremony means that the participant should spread brightness and fragrance for others. Mha Puja is a revered custom among Newars, and is observed outside Nepal too.

== The mandala ==
The mandala is a sandpainting made with powdered limestone. The Mha Puja mandala is drawn in the shape of an eight-petalled lotus inside a circle marked with water. It can be drawn freehand or by using a stencil or mould. At the center of the mandala, a small circle is drawn with mustard oil. This is surrounded by concentric rings marked with red rice, black lentil, black soybean, unhusked rice and puffed rice as per family tradition.

The items used to adorn the mandala symbolize good fortune, long life and freedom from perils. The mandala has been interpreted as a microcosmic and macrocosmic representation of the self. The ingredients used to construct the Mha Puja mandala may differ as per caste group and family tradition, but the philosophy behind the ceremony is the same.

== The feast ==
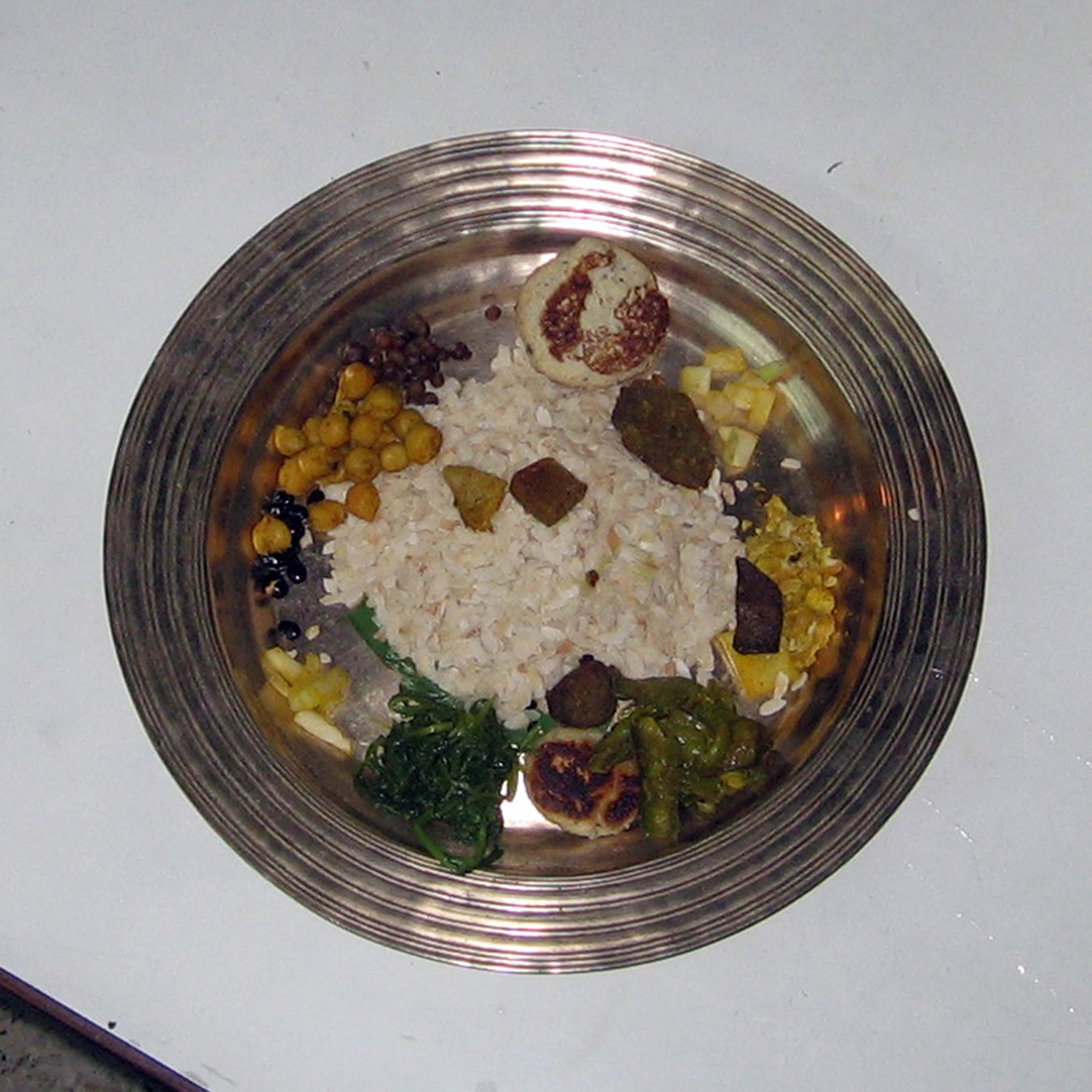
Bronze dinner plate with initial servings

At the end of the ceremony, the family members partake a feast. The bronze plate containing auspicious food items is placed on one's mandala, destroying the not so perfect mandala made and decorated design to signify worldly impermanence.

The main menu consists of a set of eight items representing the Astha Matrika, the eight grandmother goddesses who are worshipped as protectors. They are known as Ajima in Nepal Bhasa. The arrangement of the food on the plate also represents a mandala, with a mound of beaten rice at the center surrounded by portions of eight side dishes. In addition, other food items are served to make a sumptuous feast. After dinner, the plates and leftover food are left as they are overnight. The floor is swept clean the next day.

== See also ==
- Swanti (festival)
- Nepal Sambat
- Sagan (ceremony)
