= Chhaang =

Nepalese and Tibetan alcoholic beverage

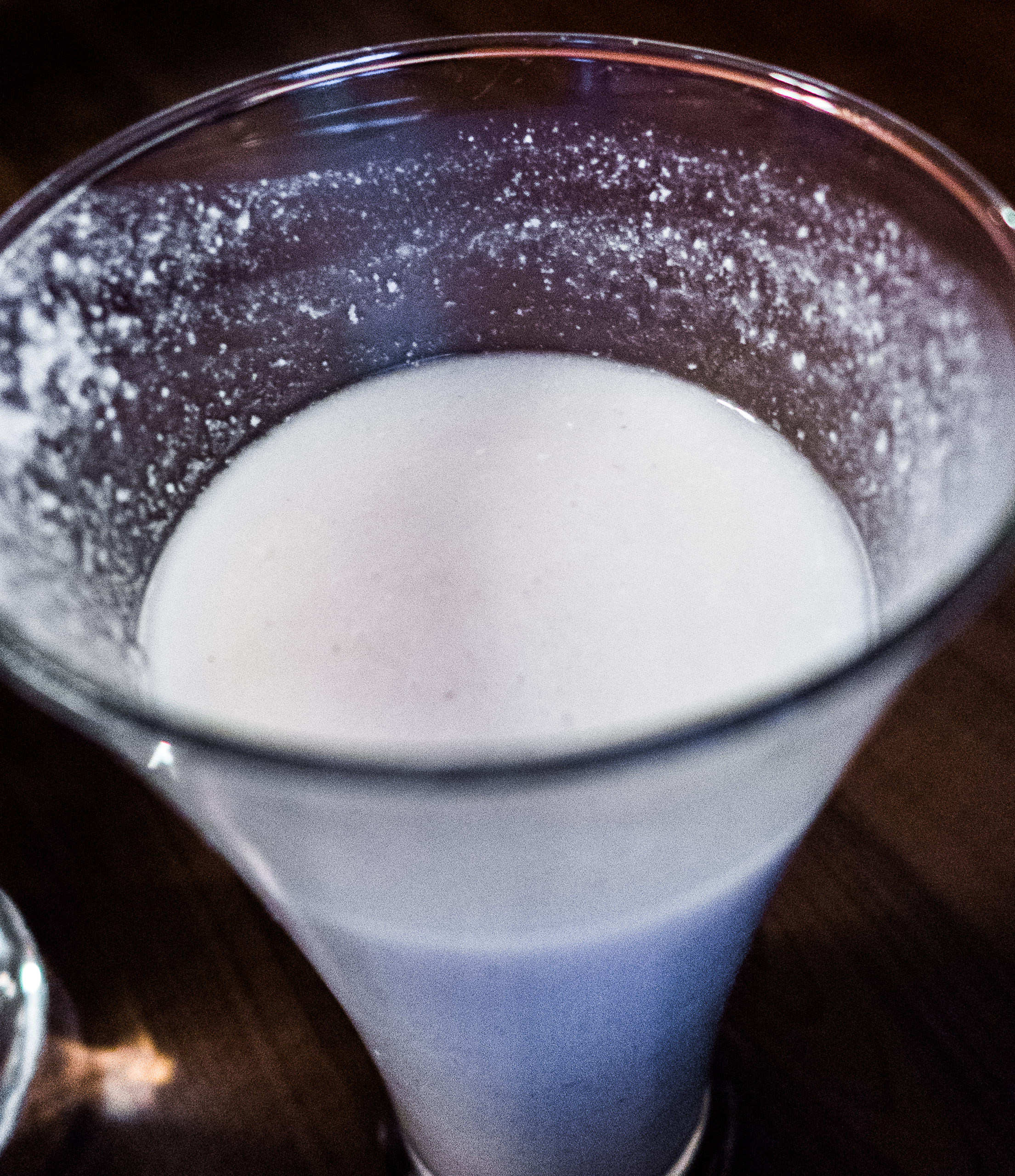
- Nepalese chhaang brewed from rice
- Type: Rice beer
- Origin: Nepal; Tibet
- Ingredients: Rice
- Related products: Raksi; Tongba

Chhaang or Chhyang (Nepali: छ्याङ; Tibetan: ཆང་) is a traditional Himalayan alcoholic beverage natively consumed by Tibetan and Nepalese. It is also known as jaarh in Nepal. It is typically made from fermented grains such as rice, barley, or millet.

== Geographical prevalence ==
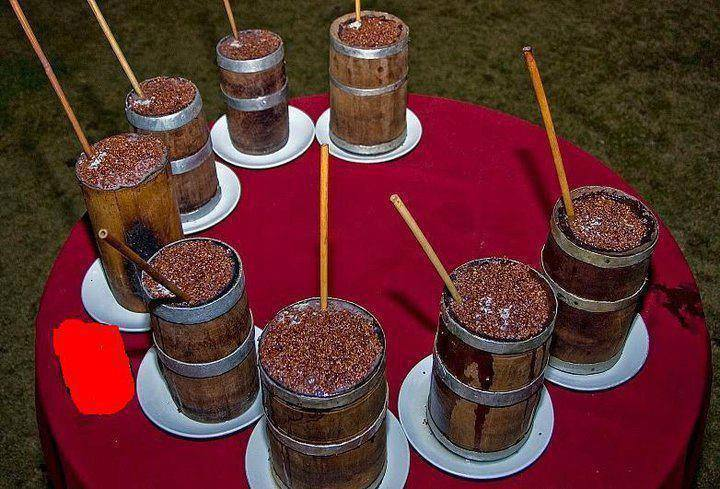
Tongba: Limbu style, hot millet beer

Chhaang is consumed by the ethnically Tibetan, Ladakhi and Nepalese, and to a lesser degree, by the people of the neighboring nations of Pakistan and Bhutan. It is usually drunk at room temperature in summer, but is often served piping-hot in brass bowls or wooden mugs when the weather is colder. The Limbu people of eastern Nepal call the drink Thee: and a separate unique drink is called Tongba.

== Ingredients and drinking ==
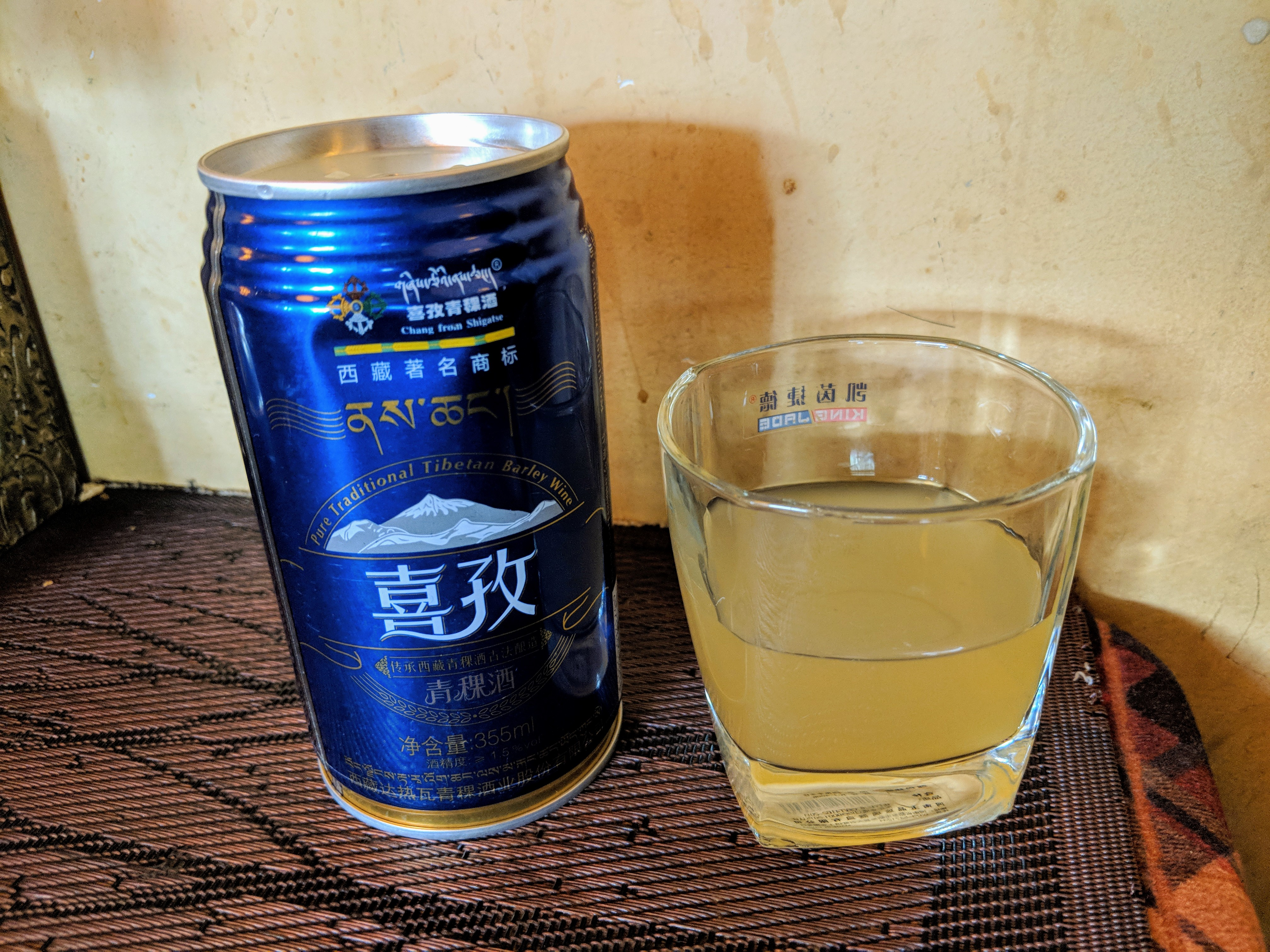
A commercially produced Tibetan chang brewed from barley

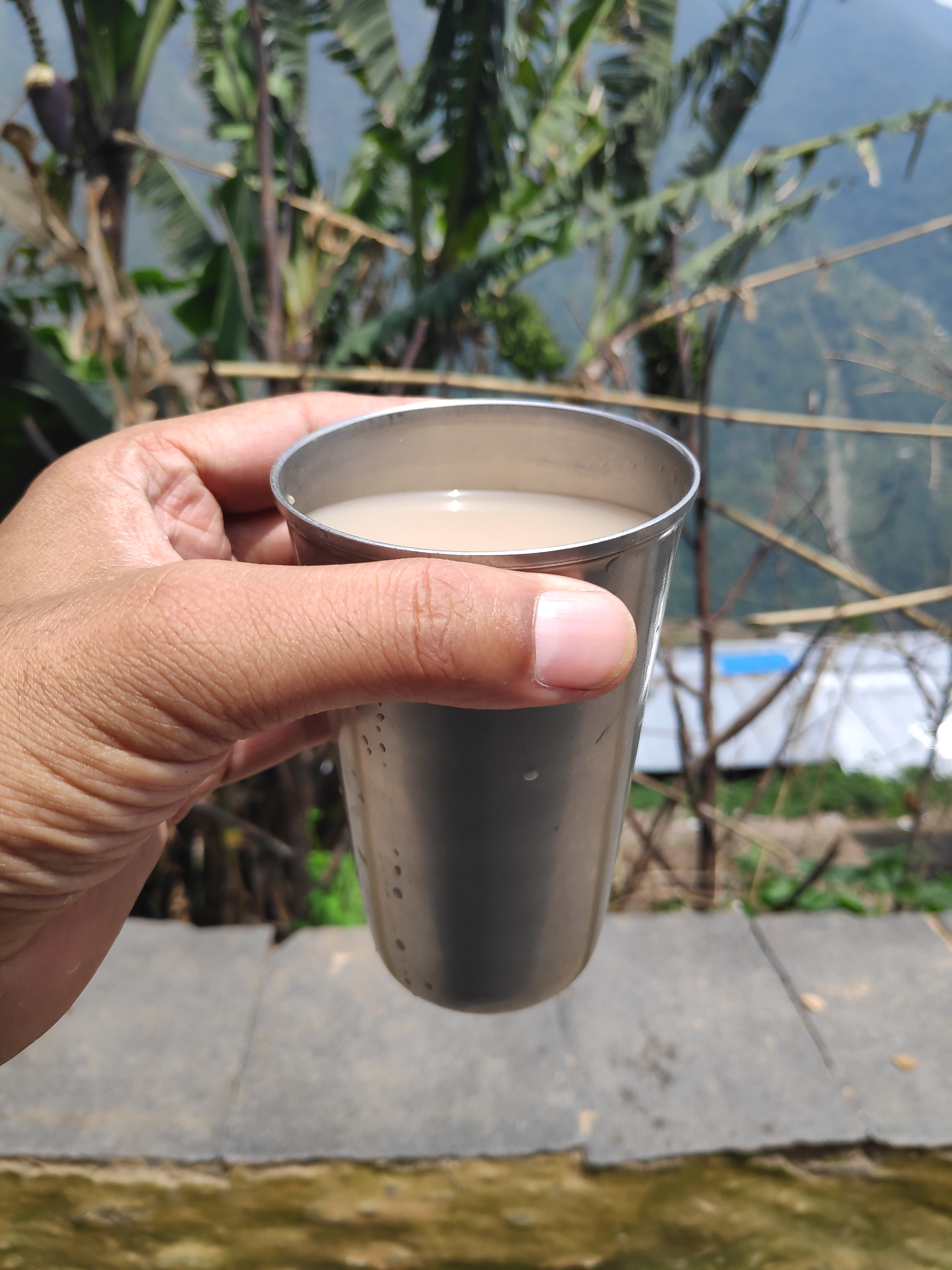
A metal beaker of home-brewed Chhaang

Chhaang is a relative of beer. Barley, millet (finger-millet) or rice grains are used to brew the drink. Semi-fermented seeds of millet are served, stuffed in a barrel of bamboo called a dhungro. Boiling water is then poured in and sipped through a narrow-bore bamboo tube called a pipsing.

When the boiled barley has cooled, some yeast or dried barm is added and it is left to stand for two or three days after fermentation begins. This concoction is called glum. The barm consists of flour and, in Balti, often has ginger and aconite added to it. After fermentation is complete, water is added to the brew and it is then ready for consumption.

In Lahaul the glum is pressed out by hand instead of by filtering, yielding a rather cloudy drink. The residue of malt can be pressed through a strainer and then mixed with water or milk and used in baking bread or cakes.

Near Mount Everest of Nepal, chhaang is made by passing hot water through fermenting barley, and is then served in a large pot and drunk through a wooden straw.

This beverage is similar to the traditional drink of the Limbus, mandokpenaa thee.

Nepalese jand refers to the turbid liquor which is obtained by leaching out the extract with water from the fermented mash. Unlike chhang or tongba, jand is served in large mugs. These alcoholic beverages are generated using a traditional starter called murcha. Murcha itself is prepared by using yeast and mold flora of wild herbs in cereal flours.

== Aconite and potential toxicity ==
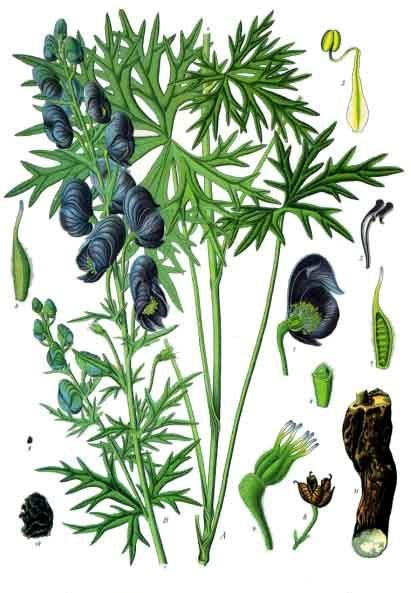
Aconitum ferox, the most toxic of the Aconitum spp. native to the Himalayan region

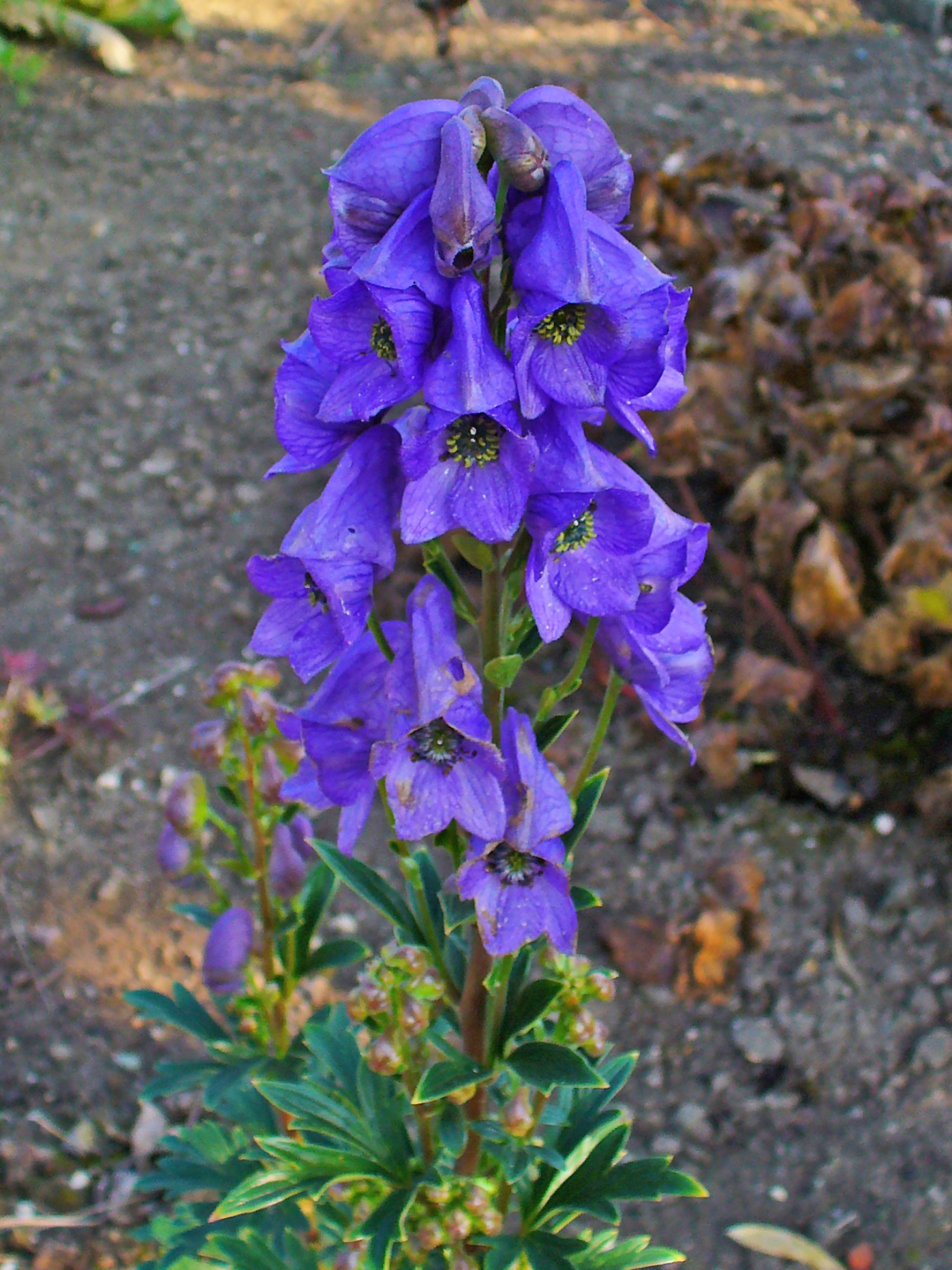
Aconitum carmichaelii , another local species added to Chhaang

The plant name Aconite may refer to two plant genera in the family Ranunculaceae, namely Aconitum and Eranthis, although Eranthis is known more usually as Winter Aconite. The plants used in the brewing of Chhaang in Baltistan and Ladakh are, however, almost certainly referable to Aconitum species - notably the local Aconitum ferox - which have a long history of use in the folk medicinal systems of Asia. Aconitum species are among the most virulently poisonous plants known, containing a variety of extremely toxic alkaloids, including aconitine and pseudaconitine.

The use of Aconitum as an additive in beer-brewing is therefore a practice fraught with the danger of fatal poisoning and should on no account be undertaken by any individual attempting to replicate a traditional Chhaang recipe. Although individual Aconitum species vary somewhat in the degree of their toxicity, all are poisonous and, when used in traditional herbal medicine, are invariably pre-treated in various ways intended to minimise their toxicity, while retaining their assumed therapeutic properties. Nevertheless, numerous fatalities have occurred resulting from such medicinal use e.g. in certain Chinese medicinal soups consumed for their supposed tonic effects, which include augmenting physical strength, boosting the immune system, and dispelling 'wind' and 'dampness'.

== Culture ==
Chhaang is said to be the best remedy to ward off the severe cold of the mountains. It reputedly has many healing properties for conditions like the common cold, fevers, allergic rhinitis, and alcoholism among others.

It is commonly served as a welcome drink and forms part of social and religious occasions in Himalayan communities.

According to legend, chhaang is also popular with the Yeti, or Himalayan Snowmen, who often raid isolated mountain villages to drink it.

== Social correlates ==
Drinking and making offerings of chhaang are part of many pan-Tibetan social and religious occasions, including settling disputes, welcoming guests, and wooing.

== See also ==
- Alcohol in Nepal
- Raksi – Nepalese and Tibetan distilled alcoholic beverage.
- Tibetan beer
- Tongba
- List of Indian beverages
- List of Tibetan dishes
