= Sagan (ceremony) =

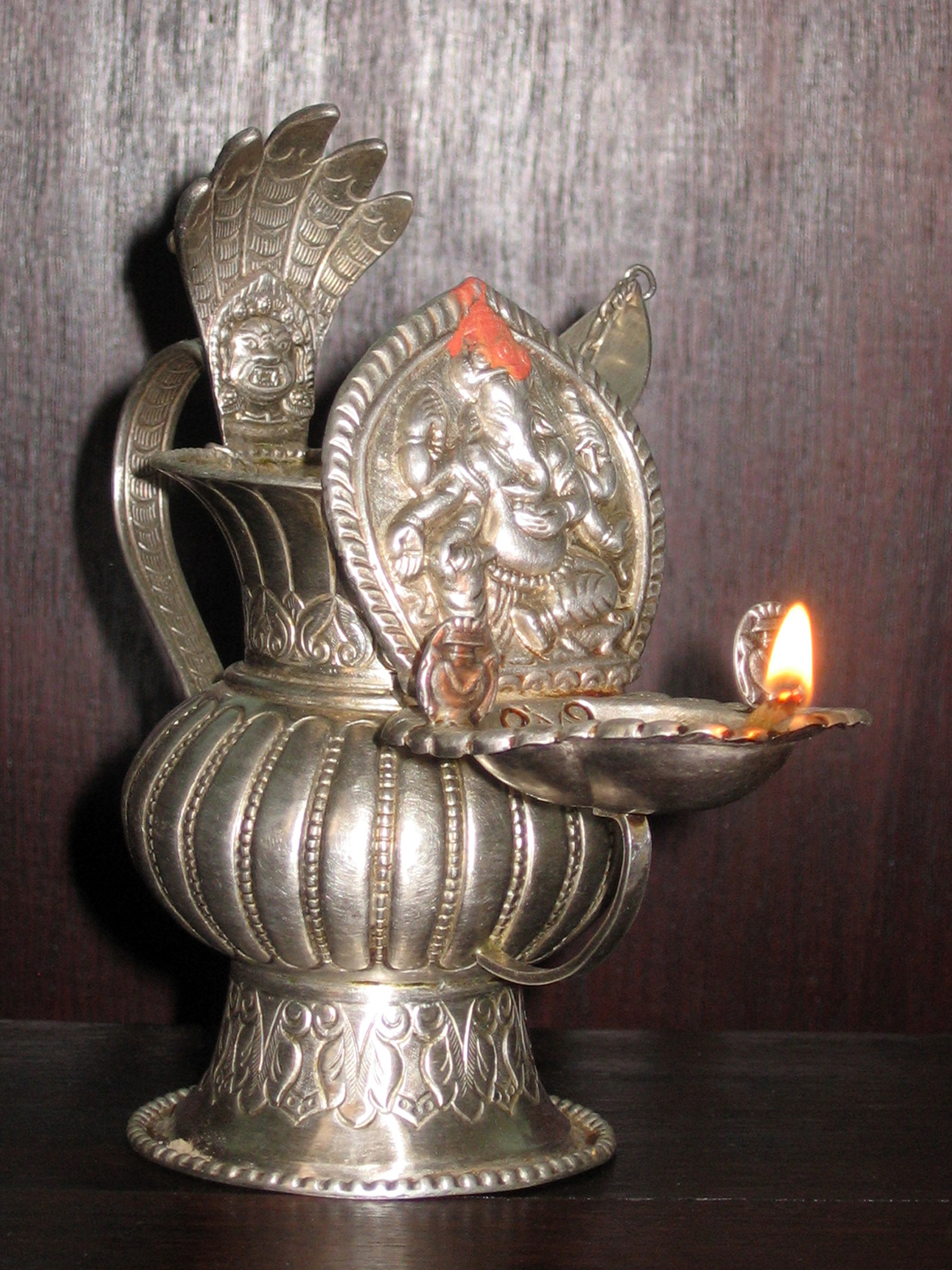
Sukunda oil lamp made of silver

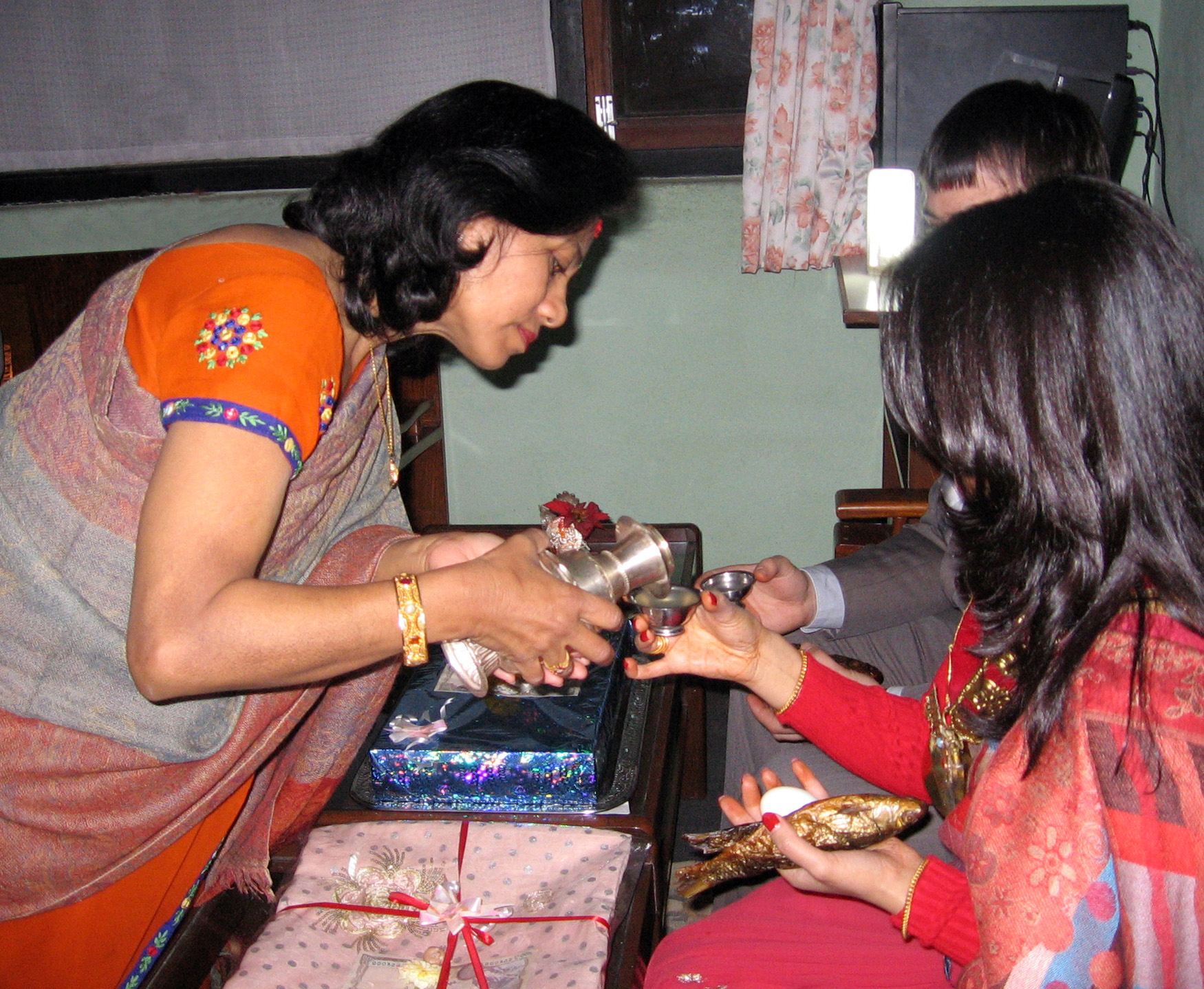
Serving rice wine during Sagan, note egg and smoked fish in left hand

Sagun (Nepali: सगन) is a Nepalese ceremony which involves ritualized presentation of auspicious food to a person to invoke good fortune and show respect. It is a highly revered ceremony in Newar society of the Kathmandu Valley. The food items served are boiled egg, smoked fish, meat, lentil cake and rice wine which represent Tantric concepts.

The Sagan is presented during life-cycle events like birthdays, weddings and old-age rites. It is also presented at the Mha Puja ceremony on New Year's Day of Nepal Era. Travellers are given the Sagan before departing on a long journey and upon return from a trip. People who have achieved a special feat or survived a life-threatening accident also receive it. The ceremony is also held to honor somebody. The Sagan ritual is performed by both Hindu and Buddhist Newars.

== Ceremony ==
As per the general practice, the person receiving the Sagan sits cross-legged on the floor, and a Sukunda oil lamp is placed on a large leaf in front and to the right. The eldest woman in the house brings a tray containing flowers, rice and red paste and worships Ganesha, the Hindu god of good fortune, on the Sukunda. She then puts a dab of red paste on the forehead of the honoree and others in the room. The participants also take a dab of yogurt from a bowl and put it on the temple.

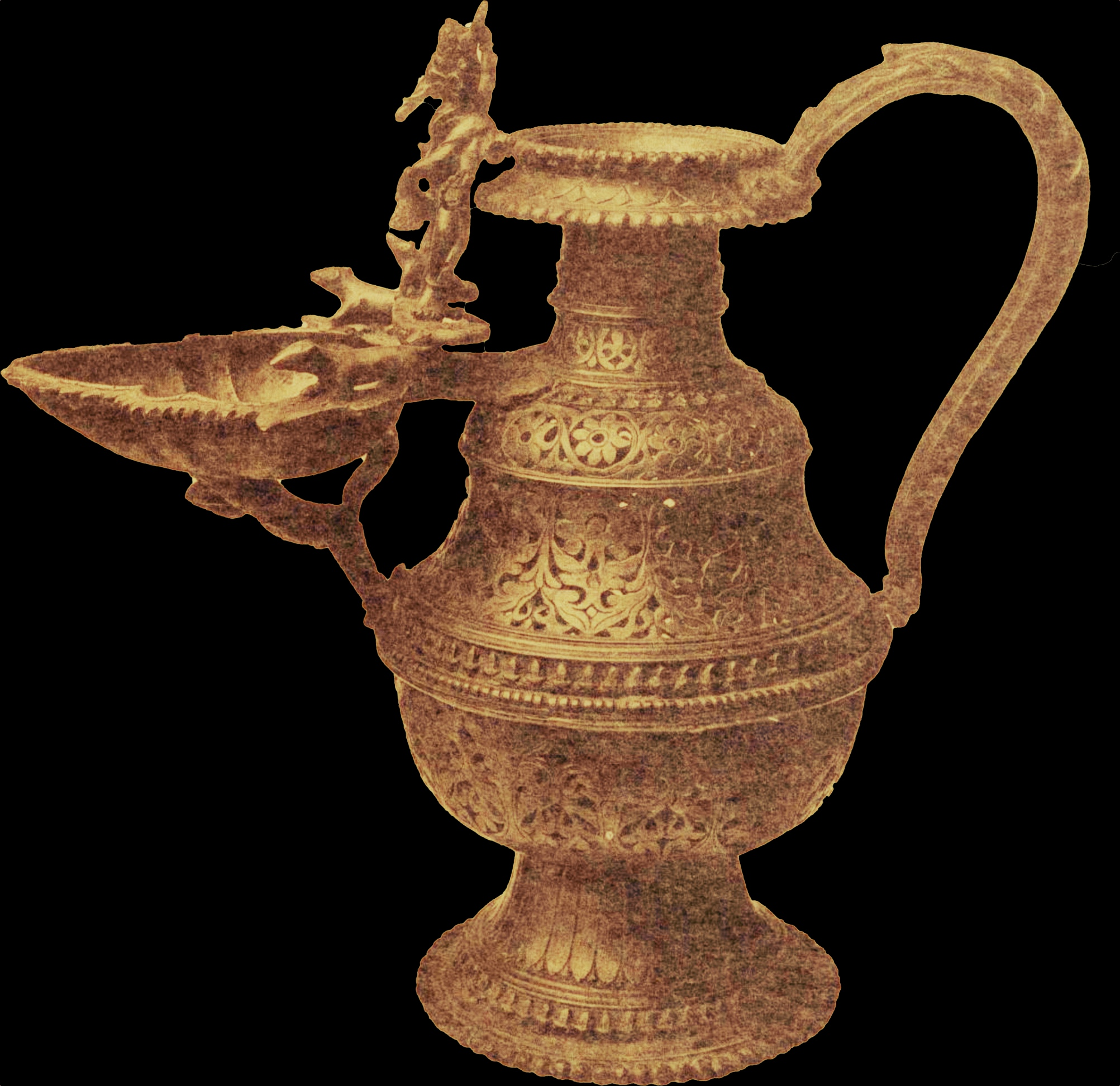
19th-century Sukunda ritual lamp, Newar Nepal

The main ritual is performed next. The lady of the house presents a boiled egg and smoked fish which the participants accept with both hands. A woman helper then pours rice wine from a jar into little bowls. After everyone has been served, she walks down the line again, pouring wine three times into each bowl. She serves wine a third time after which the participants can set down the bowls.

The procedure and materials may vary as per family tradition and geography. Laddu (sweet balls) or Lāgwah (meat balls) may be presented in place of boiled eggs. Seating may be arranged on the floor or chairs

== Significance ==
The Sagan ceremony and the materials used are based on Tantric tradition. The five food items in Sagan represent the five Tantric elements (panchatatwa) – fire or "agni tatwa" (symbolized by wine), earth or "prithvi tatwa" (meat), water or "jal tatwa" (fish), ether or "akash tatwa" (lentil cake) and air or "wayu tatwa" (egg). The warmth and fire in living beings is provided by fire, and when a being dies, the body becomes the earth, the body contains water, breathe air and exist in ether or space.

== See also ==
- Prasāda
- Alcohol in Nepal
