= Tongba =

Nepalese fermented millet beverage

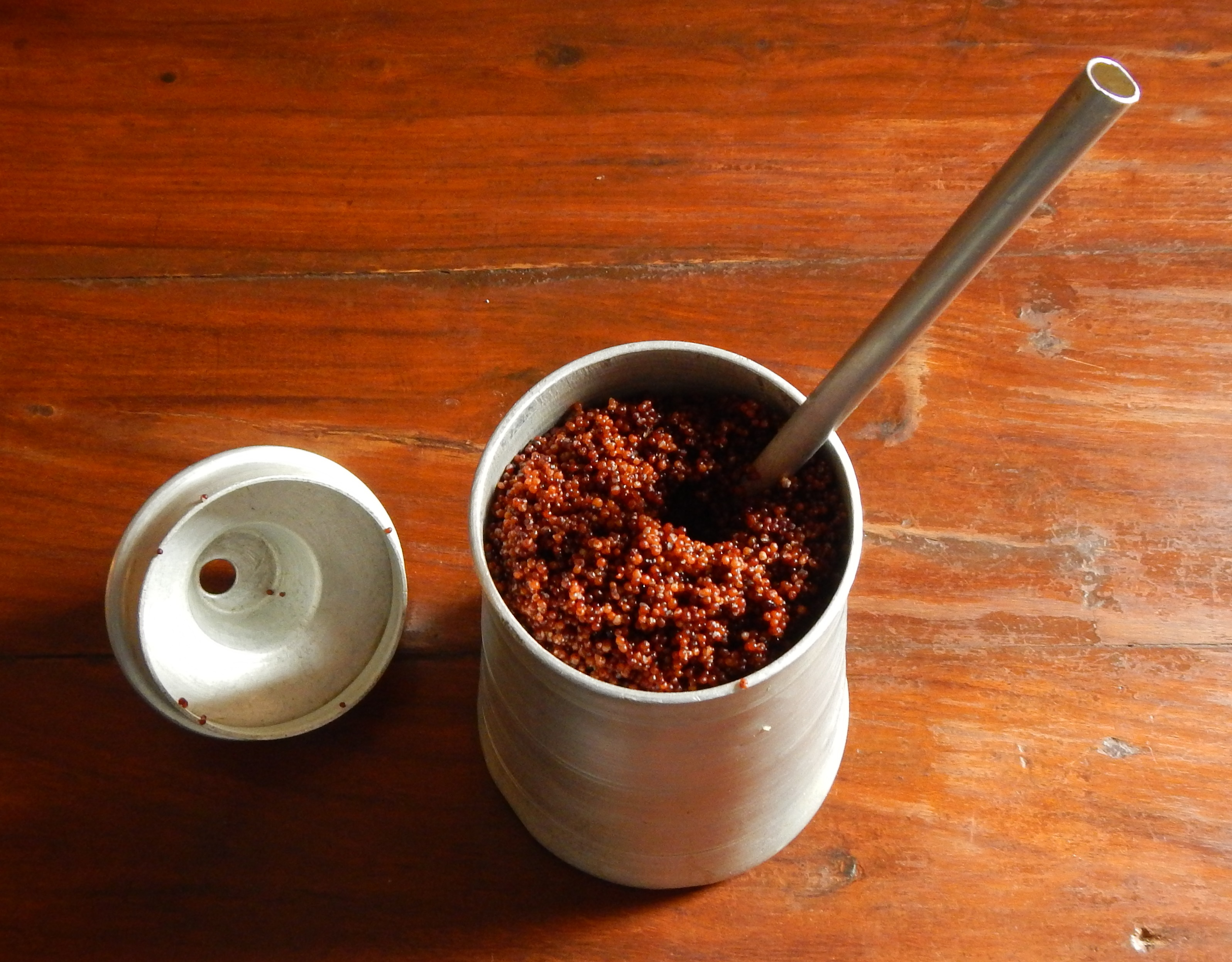
- Tongba in its namesake vessel.
- Type: Alcoholic beverage
- Origin: Nepal; India (Sikkim), Limbuwan ( ᤕᤠᤀᤷᤓᤢᤅ ᤗᤠᤈᤣ) present day Eastern Nepal and Sikkim
- Introduced: Limbu
- Alcohol by volume: 2–5%
- Proof (US): 4–10°
- Colour: milky white
- Ingredients: millet, yeast, water etc.
- Related products: Chhaang

Tongba (pronounced [toŋba]; Limbu: ᤋᤥᤱᤒᤠ) is a millet-based alcoholic beverage found in the eastern mountainous region of Nepal and neighbouring Indian regions of Sikkim and Darjeeling.

== Cultural importance ==
Tongba is used at celebratations in the Limbu community. Getting offered a Tongba is a sign of respect to a guest, and an important element of special occasions, religious functions, traditional events and festivals. It is the indigenous, traditional and cultural drink of the Limbu people. Tongba drinking among guests and Tongba sharing between a newly wed couple is an essential part of the Limbu marriage ceremony as per the Limbu Mundhum. Limbus are the only people that use Tongba as part of their wedding ceremony. Tongba is popular throughout Nepal and people of all backgrounds enjoy this drink in Nepal and abroad.

== Preparation ==
Tongba is the name of the vessel that holds the fermented millet beverage known as mandokpenaa thee. Tongba is prepared from brown finger millet (Eleusine coracana, known as ragi in India or kodo in Nepal). It is grown in hilly regions, and is cooked and combined with traditionally cultured khesung, a microbial colony or starter culture; khesung (which is a Limbu term) is called marchā in Nepali, thamik in Lepcha, khabe in Chamling language , and phab in Bhutia.

== Ethno-medicinal properties ==
Tongba contains biologically active components that may have therapeutic properties against high-altitude illnesses. Tongba is made by steeping fermented millet for a few minutes, then sucking the resulting cloudy liquid through a bamboo straw with a seed-filtering bottom. It is slightly alcoholic, smooth, and has a mild, milky, mushroomy taste with some bready hints.

Tongba is a staple for backpack travelers. It helps with digestion and boosts immunity.

Tongba contains glycoside, amino acids, fatty acids, terpenoids, and phenol, which have antioxidant and antibacterial potential and therapeutic properties against high-altitude illnesses including body moisture retention property in high-altitude cold and dry weather. Studies have reported tongba is metabolomically similar to Japanese sake.

== Gallery ==
Tongba texture from Sikkim, India

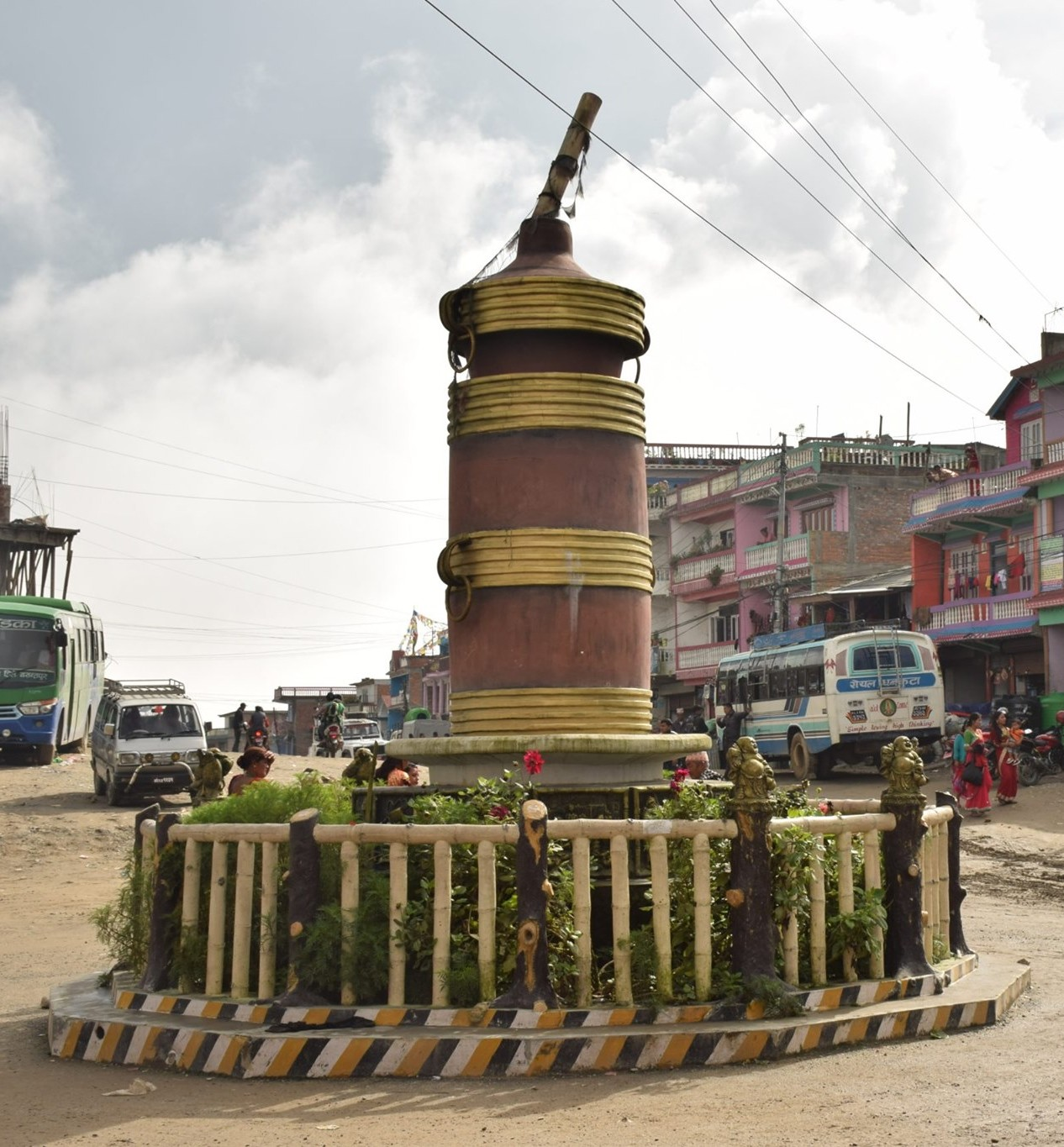
Tongba statue in Tongba Chowk, Hile, Nepal

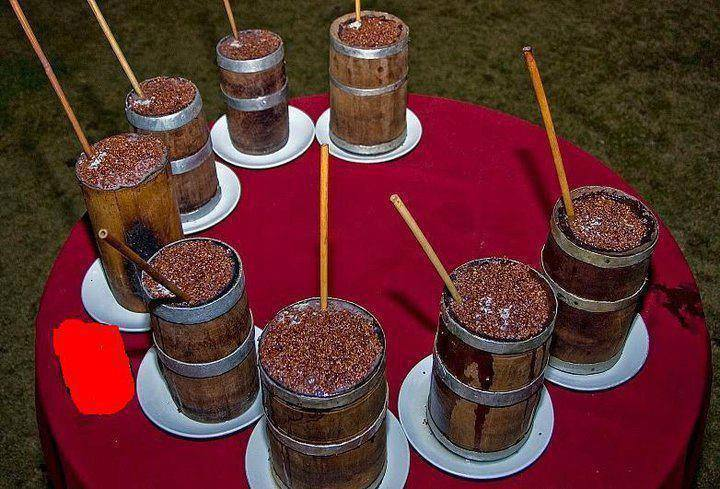
A table of Nepalese tongba

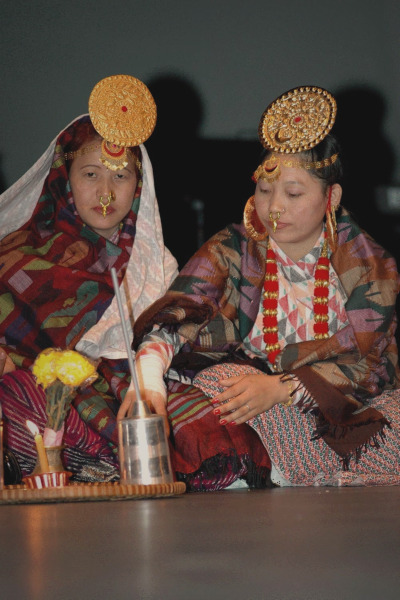
Limbu women drinking tongba

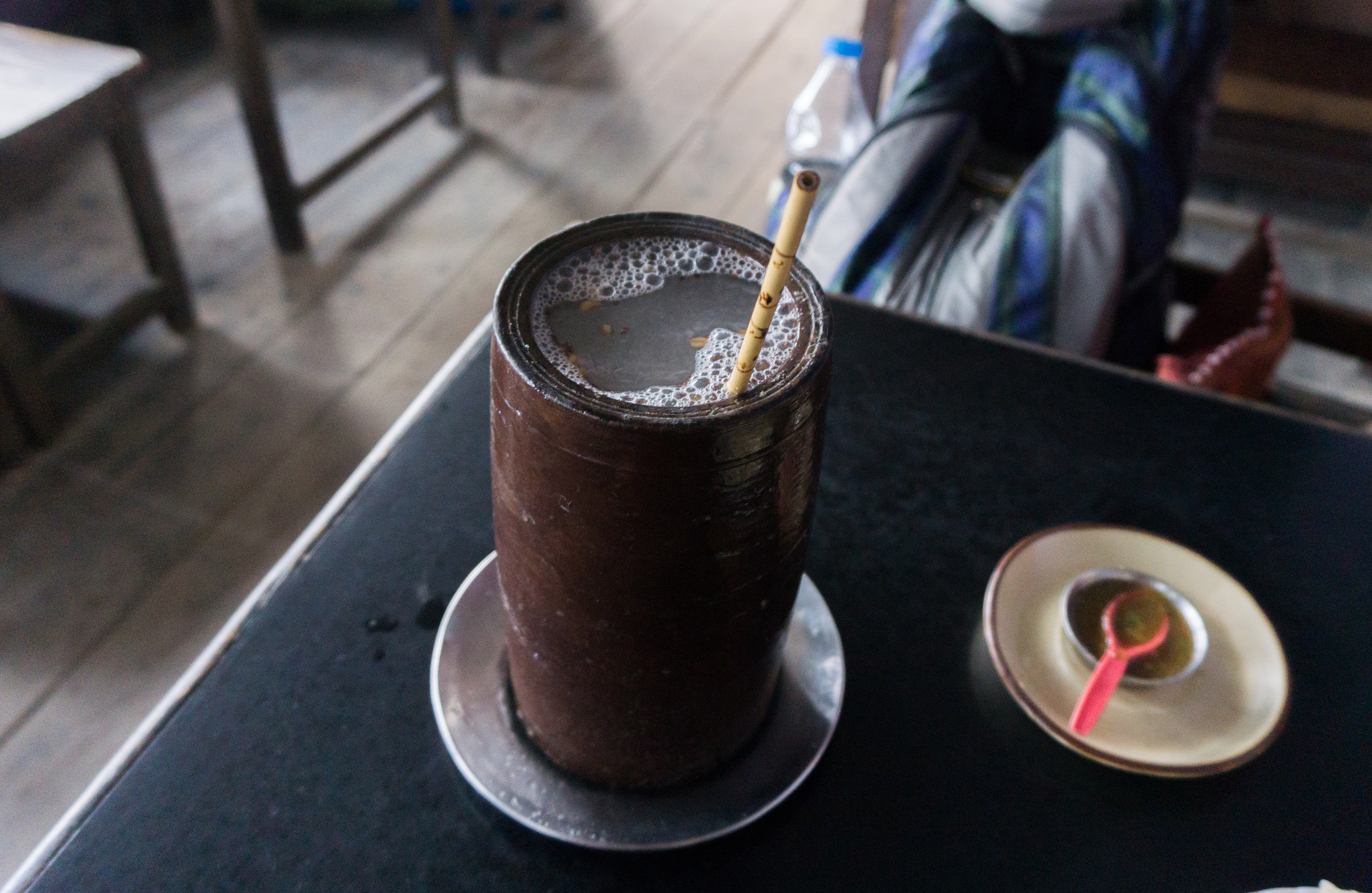
Tongba at a cafe in Darjeeling

== See also ==
- Chhaang
