= Baiocco (surname) =

Baiocco (pronounced [baˈjɔkko]) is an Italian surname, derived from the name of baiocco coins used as a nickname for short people. Notable people with the surname include:

- Dana Baiocco, former member of the U.S. Consumer Product Safety Commission
- Davide Baiocco (born 1975), Italian footballer
- Matteo Baiocco (born 1984), Italian motorcycle racer
- Paolo Baiocco (born 1989), Italian footballer

== See also ==
- Baiocchi
