= Baiocchi =

Baiocchi (pronounced [baˈjɔkki]) is an Italian surname, derived from the name of baiocco coins used as a nickname for short people. Notable people with the surname include:

- Claudio Baiocchi (1940–2020), Italian mathematician
- Hugh Baiocchi (born 1946), South African professional golfer
- Regina Harris Baiocchi (born 1956), American musician, music educator, composer and writer

== See also ==
- Baiocco (surname)
- Mallosia baiocchii
