= Mallosia interrupta =

Scientific classification
- Kingdom: Animalia
- Phylum: Arthropoda
- Class: Insecta
- Order: Coleoptera
- Suborder: Polyphaga
- Infraorder: Cucujiformia
- Family: Cerambycidae
- Genus: Mallosia
- Species: M. interrupta

Binomial name
- Mallosia interrupta Pic, 1905

Synonyms
- Mallosia scovitzi interrupta Pic, 1905; Mallosia scowitzi var. interrupta Pic, 1905 (misspelling)

Species of beetle

Mallosia interrupta is a species of beetle in the family Cerambycidae. It was described by Maurice Pic in 1905, originally as a varietas of the species Mallosia scowitzi. It is known from Turkey and Iran.
