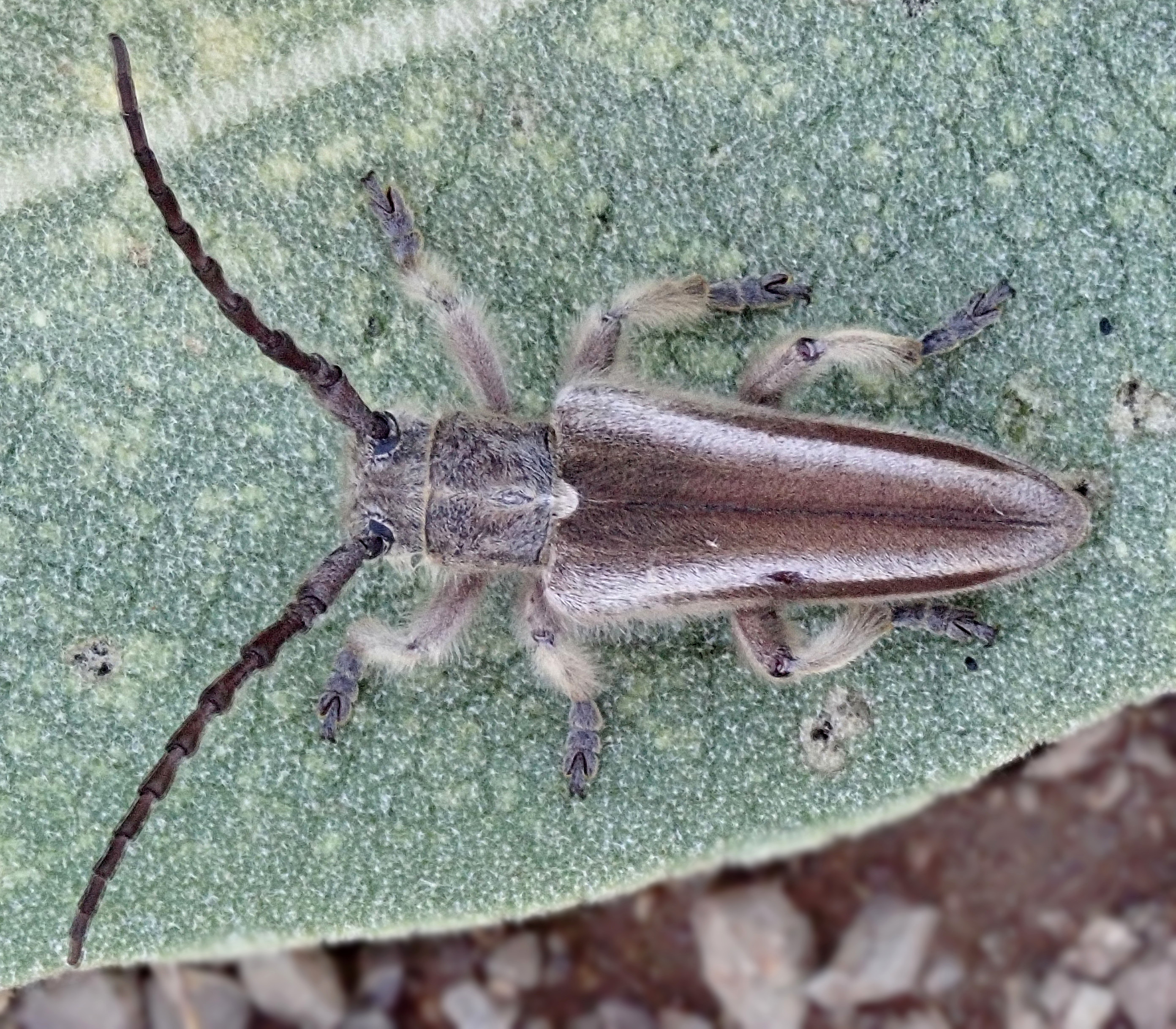
- Mallosia graeca

Scientific classification
- Domain: Eukaryota
- Kingdom: Animalia
- Phylum: Arthropoda
- Class: Insecta
- Order: Coleoptera
- Suborder: Polyphaga
- Infraorder: Cucujiformia
- Family: Cerambycidae
- Subfamily: Lamiinae
- Tribe: Saperdini
- Genus: Mallosia; Mulsant, 1863

= Mallosia =

Genus of beetles

Mallosia, described by Étienne Mulsant in 1847, is a genus of longhorn beetles of the subfamily Lamiinae, tribe Saperdini. It is distributed in the Palearctic, from Greece to Caucasus and Iran.

== Distribution ==
The genus includes:

- subgenus Mallosia Mulsant, 1863
  - species Mallosia graeca (Sturm, 1843)
- subgenus Micromallosia Pic, 1900
  - species Mallosia heinzorum Holzschuh, 1991
  - species Mallosia heydeni (Ganglbauer, 1888)
  - species Mallosia theresae (Pic, 1900)
- subgenus Anatomallosia Özdikmen & Aytar, 2012
  - species Mallosia nonnigra Özdikmen & Aytar, 2012
- subgenus Eumallosia Danilevsky, 1990
  - species Mallosia armeniaca Pic, 1897
  - species Mallosia brevipes Pic, 1897
  - species Mallosia costata Pic, 1898
  - species Mallosia herminae Reitter, 1890
  - species Mallosia imperatrix Abeille de Perrin, 1885
- subgenus Eusemnosia Özdikmen & Aytar, 2012
  - species Mallosia baiocchii (Sama, 2000)
  - species Mallosia interrupta Pic, 1905
  - species Mallosia mirabilis Faldermann, 1837
  - species Mallosia tristis Reitter, 1888
- subgenus Submallosia Özdikmen & Aytar, 2012
  - species Mallosia jakowlewi Semenov, 1895
  - species Mallosia tamashaczi Sama & Székely, 2010
- subgenus Semnosia K. Daniel, 1904
  - species Mallosia galinae Danilevsky, 1990
  - species Mallosia scovitzii (Faldermann, 1837)
