= Mallosia brevipes =

Scientific classification
- Kingdom: Animalia
- Phylum: Arthropoda
- Class: Insecta
- Order: Coleoptera
- Suborder: Polyphaga
- Infraorder: Cucujiformia
- Family: Cerambycidae
- Genus: Mallosia
- Species: M. brevipes

Binomial name
- Mallosia brevipes Pic, 1897

Synonyms
- Mallosia imperatrix cribratofasciata K. Daniel, 1904; Semnosia brevipes (Pic, 1897)

Species of beetle

Mallosia brevipes is a species of beetle in the family Cerambycidae. It was described by Maurice Pic in 1897. It is known from Iran, Armenia, and possibly also Turkey.
