= Mallosia costata =

Scientific classification
- Kingdom: Animalia
- Phylum: Arthropoda
- Class: Insecta
- Order: Coleoptera
- Suborder: Polyphaga
- Infraorder: Cucujiformia
- Family: Cerambycidae
- Genus: Mallosia
- Species: M. costata

Binomial name
- Mallosia costata Pic, 1898

Synonyms
- Mallosia costata kurdistana Breuning, 1970; Mallosia imperatrix kurdistana Breuning, 1970; Mallosia kurdistana Breuning, 1970

Species of beetle

Mallosia costata is a species of beetle in the family Cerambycidae. It was described by Maurice Pic in 1898. It is known from Turkey and Iran.
