= Mallosia imperatrix =

Scientific classification
- Domain: Eukaryota
- Kingdom: Animalia
- Phylum: Arthropoda
- Class: Insecta
- Order: Coleoptera
- Suborder: Polyphaga
- Infraorder: Cucujiformia
- Family: Cerambycidae
- Genus: Mallosia
- Species: M. imperatrix

Binomial name
- Mallosia imperatrix (Abeille de Perrin, 1885)

Synonyms
- Mallosia robusta Pic, 1901; Semnosia imperatrix (Abeille de Perrin) Tauzin, 2000

Species of beetle

Mallosia imperatrix is a species of beetle in the family Cerambycidae, that can be found in Iran, Lebanon, Syria, and Turkey. The species is yellowish-black coloured.
