= Mallosia nonnigra =

Scientific classification
- Kingdom: Animalia
- Phylum: Arthropoda
- Class: Insecta
- Order: Coleoptera
- Suborder: Polyphaga
- Infraorder: Cucujiformia
- Family: Cerambycidae
- Genus: Mallosia
- Species: M. nonnigra

Binomial name
- Mallosia nonnigra Özdikmen & Aytar, 2012

Species of beetle

Mallosia nonnigra is a species of beetle in the family Cerambycidae. It was described by Hüseyin Özdikmen and Fatih Aytar in 2012. It is known from Turkey.

This species was described based on a single specimen from Erdemli. The holotype is a female that has a body length of 28 mm (1.1 in).
