= Mallosia herminae =

Scientific classification
- Domain: Eukaryota
- Kingdom: Animalia
- Phylum: Arthropoda
- Class: Insecta
- Order: Coleoptera
- Suborder: Polyphaga
- Infraorder: Cucujiformia
- Family: Cerambycidae
- Genus: Mallosia
- Species: M. herminae

Binomial name
- Mallosia herminae Reitter, 1890

Synonyms
- Semnosia herminae (Reitter, 1890)

Species of beetle

Mallosia herminae is a species of beetle in the family Cerambycidae. It was described by Edmund Reitter in 1890. It is known from Iran, Azerbaijan, Armenia, and Turkey.

== Subspecies ==
There are two subspecies:

- Mallosia herminae herminae Reitter, 1890
- Mallosia herminae gobustanica Danilevsky, 1990

== Description and habitat ==
Adults are 15 to 42 mm in length. It flies from May to June, and feeds on Ferula and Prangos species.
