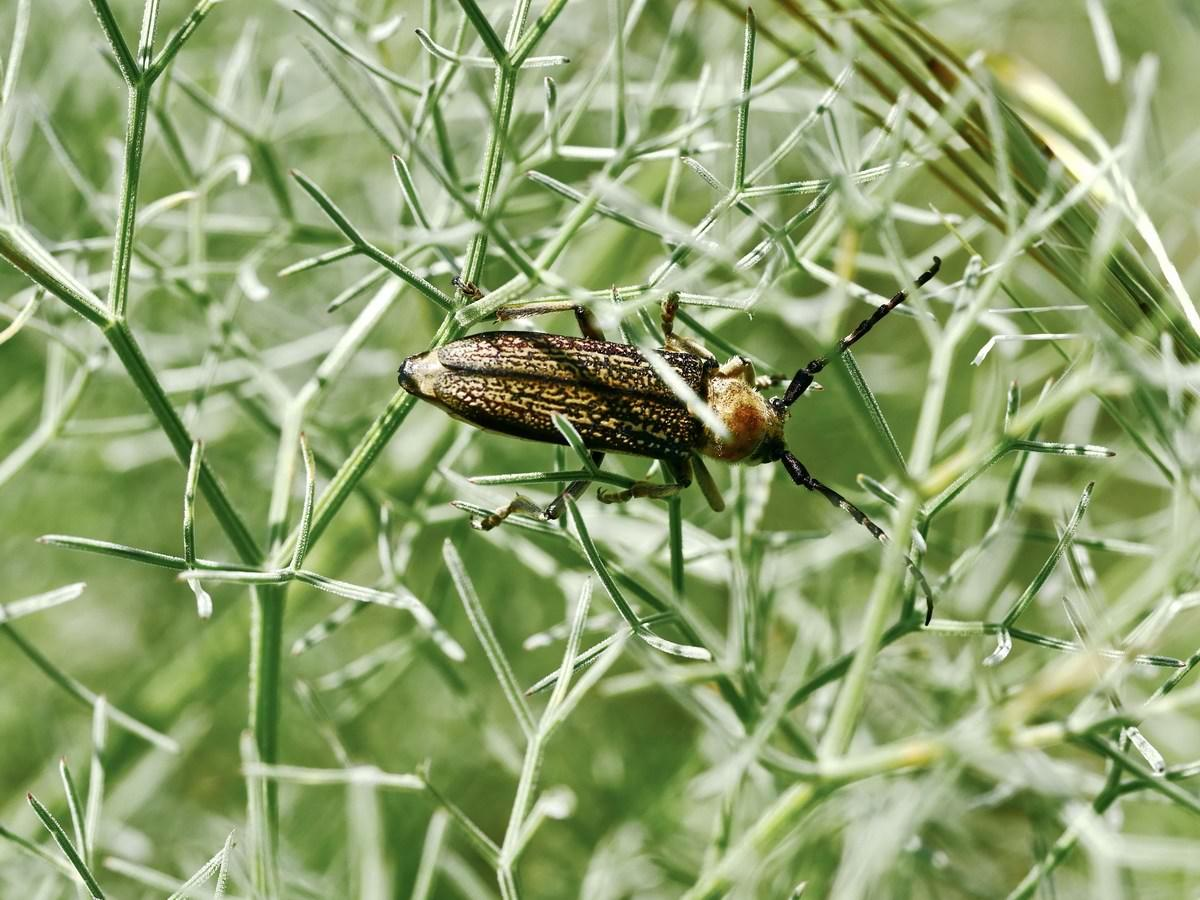

Scientific classification
- Domain: Eukaryota
- Kingdom: Animalia
- Phylum: Arthropoda
- Class: Insecta
- Order: Coleoptera
- Suborder: Polyphaga
- Infraorder: Cucujiformia
- Family: Cerambycidae
- Genus: Mallosia
- Species: M. galinae

Binomial name
- Mallosia galinae Danilevsky, 1990

= Mallosia galinae =

Species of beetle

Mallosia galinae is a species of beetle in the family Cerambycidae. It was described by Mikhail Leontievich Danilevsky in 1990. It was first discovered in Azerbaijan and is now also known from Georgia.

Mallosia galinae measure 16–40 mm (0.63–1.57 in) in length. Its host plants are Ferula and Prangos ferulacea (family Apiaceae).
