= Mallosia tristis =

Scientific classification
- Kingdom: Animalia
- Phylum: Arthropoda
- Class: Insecta
- Order: Coleoptera
- Suborder: Polyphaga
- Infraorder: Cucujiformia
- Family: Cerambycidae
- Genus: Mallosia
- Species: M. tristis

Binomial name
- Mallosia tristis Reitter, 1888

Synonyms
- Mallosia angelicae Reitter, 1890; Mallosia angelicae var. lederi Pic, 1911; Mallosia scovitzi tristis (Reitter) Danilevsky, 1990; Semnosia tristis (Reitter) Villiers, 1967

Species of beetle

Mallosia tristis is a species of beetle in the family Cerambycidae, that can be found in Azerbaijan, Iran and Turkey.
