= Mallosia mirabilis =

Scientific classification
- Domain: Eukaryota
- Kingdom: Animalia
- Phylum: Arthropoda
- Class: Insecta
- Order: Coleoptera
- Suborder: Polyphaga
- Infraorder: Cucujiformia
- Family: Cerambycidae
- Genus: Mallosia
- Species: M. mirabilis

Binomial name
- Mallosia mirabilis Faldermann, 1837

Synonyms
- Mallosia ganglbaueri Pic, 1905; Mallosia ganglbaueri var. semirubra Pic, 1905; Mallosia ganglbaueri var. multimaculata Pic, 1905; Mallosia delagrangei Pic, 1905; Semnosia mirabilis (Faldermann, 1837)

Species of beetle

Mallosia mirabilis is a species of beetle in the family Cerambycidae. It was described by Faldermann in 1837. It is known from Iraq, Turkey and Iran.

== Subspecies ==
- Mallosia mirabilis mirabilis Faldermann, 1837
- Mallosia mirabilis devexula Holzschuh, 1989
