= Mallosia theresae =

Scientific classification
- Kingdom: Animalia
- Phylum: Arthropoda
- Class: Insecta
- Order: Coleoptera
- Suborder: Polyphaga
- Infraorder: Cucujiformia
- Family: Cerambycidae
- Genus: Mallosia
- Species: M. theresae

Binomial name
- Mallosia theresae (Pic, 1900)

Synonyms
- Micromallosia theresae Pic, 1900

Species of beetle

Mallosia theresae is a species of beetle in the family Cerambycidae. It was described by Maurice Pic in 1900. It is endemic to Turkey.

Mallosia theresae measure 8–13 mm (0.31–0.51 in) in length.
