= Mallosia heinzorum =

Scientific classification
- Kingdom: Animalia
- Phylum: Arthropoda
- Class: Insecta
- Order: Coleoptera
- Suborder: Polyphaga
- Infraorder: Cucujiformia
- Family: Cerambycidae
- Genus: Mallosia
- Species: M. heinzorum

Binomial name
- Mallosia heinzorum Holzschuh, 1991

Synonyms
- Micromallosia heinzorum (Holzschuh, 1991)

Species of beetle

Mallosia heinzorum is a species of beetle in the family Cerambycidae. It was described by Carolus Holzschuh in 1991. It is endemic to Turkey.

Mallosia heinzorum measure 7–13 mm (0.28–0.51 in) in length. Their host plant is unknown, but their life cycle spans over one year with adults being seen between the months of April and June.
