= Mallosia jakowlewi =

Scientific classification
- Domain: Eukaryota
- Kingdom: Animalia
- Phylum: Arthropoda
- Class: Insecta
- Order: Coleoptera
- Suborder: Polyphaga
- Infraorder: Cucujiformia
- Family: Cerambycidae
- Genus: Mallosia
- Species: M. jakowlewi

Binomial name
- Mallosia jakowlewi Semenov, 1895

Synonyms
- Mallosia iranica Daniel & Daniel, 1898; Mallosia jakovlevi (Semenov) Daniel, 1904 (misspelling); Semnosia jakovlevi (Semenov) Villiers, 1967 (misspelling)

Species of beetle

Mallosia jakowlewi is a species of beetle in the family Cerambycidae. It was described by Semenov in 1895. It is known from Iran.
