= Mallosia heydeni =

Scientific classification
- Kingdom: Animalia
- Phylum: Arthropoda
- Class: Insecta
- Order: Coleoptera
- Suborder: Polyphaga
- Infraorder: Cucujiformia
- Family: Cerambycidae
- Genus: Mallosia
- Species: M. heydeni

Binomial name
- Mallosia heydeni (Ganglbauer, 1888)

Synonyms
- Phytoecia (Coptosia) Heydeni Ganglbauer, 1888; Micromallosia heydeni (Ganglbauer, 1888)

Species of beetle

Mallosia heydeni is a species of beetle in the family Cerambycidae. It was described by Ludwig Ganglbauer in 1888. It is endemic to Turkey.

Mallosia heydeni measure 7–13 mm (0.28–0.51 in) in length.
