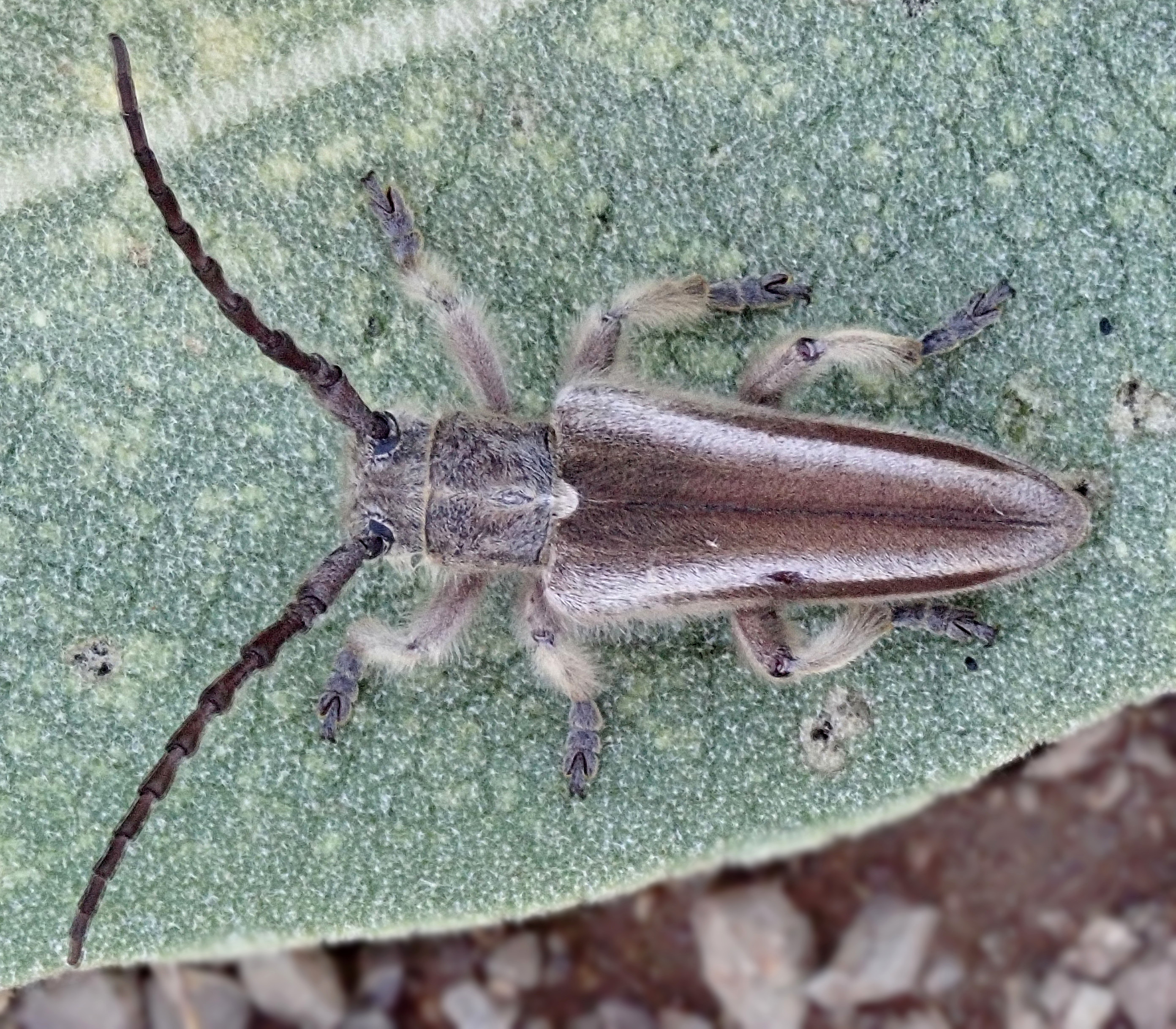

Scientific classification
- Domain: Eukaryota
- Kingdom: Animalia
- Phylum: Arthropoda
- Class: Insecta
- Order: Coleoptera
- Suborder: Polyphaga
- Infraorder: Cucujiformia
- Family: Cerambycidae
- Genus: Mallosia
- Species: M. graeca

Binomial name
- Mallosia graeca (Sturm, 1843)

Synonyms
- Saperda graeca Sturm, 1843

= Mallosia graeca =

Species of beetle

Mallosia graeca is a species of beetle in the subfamily Lamiinae, found only in the Greek mainland. The species is 13–30 mm long, and brown coloured. Its host plant is Eryngium.
