= Mallosia tamashaczi =

Scientific classification
- Domain: Eukaryota
- Kingdom: Animalia
- Phylum: Arthropoda
- Class: Insecta
- Order: Coleoptera
- Suborder: Polyphaga
- Infraorder: Cucujiformia
- Family: Cerambycidae
- Genus: Mallosia
- Species: M. tamashaczi

Binomial name
- Mallosia tamashaczi Sama & Székely, 2010

Species of beetle

Mallosia tamashaczi is a species of beetle in the family Cerambycidae. It was described by Sama and Székely in 2010. It is known from Iran.
