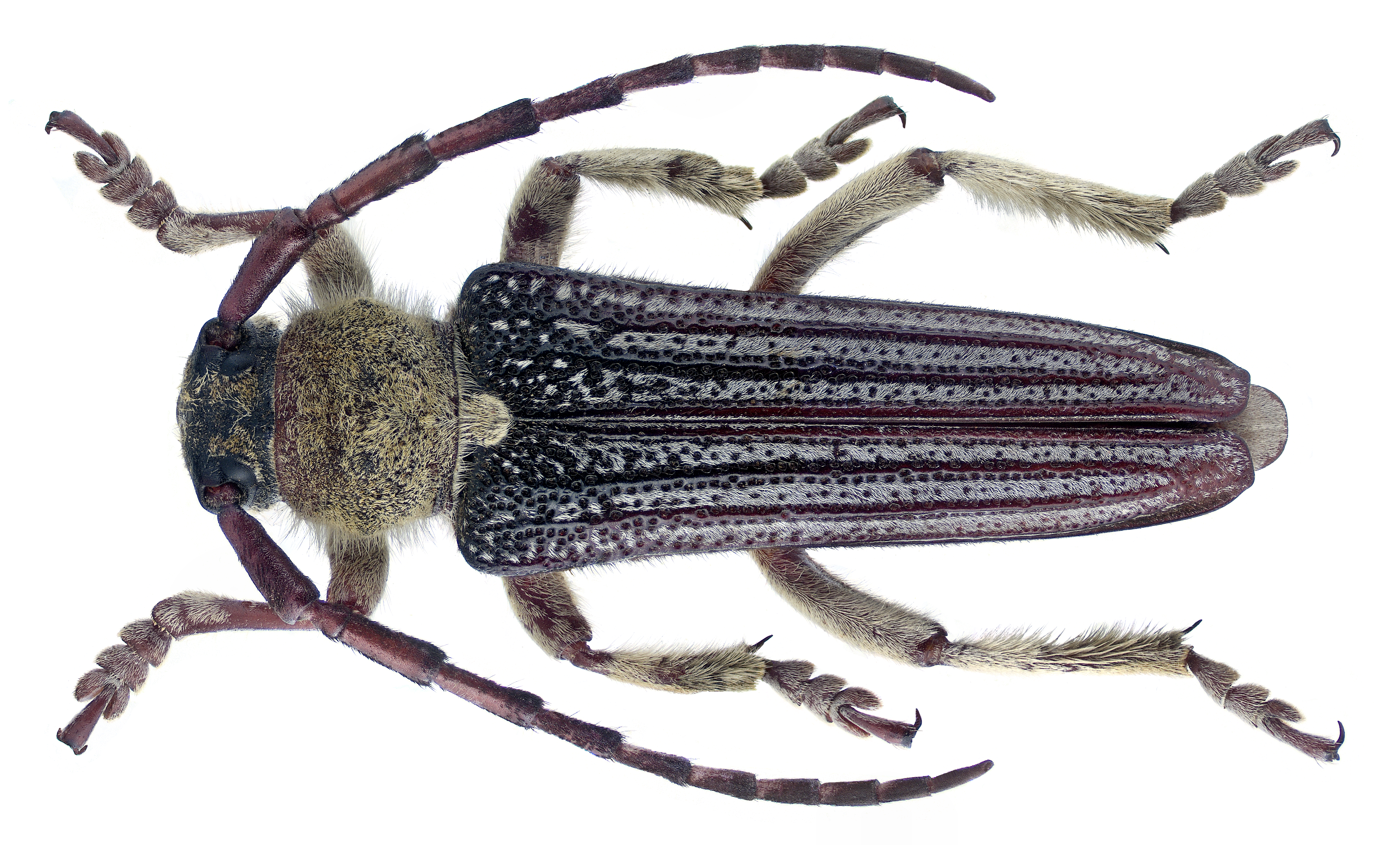

Scientific classification
- Kingdom: Animalia
- Phylum: Arthropoda
- Class: Insecta
- Order: Coleoptera
- Suborder: Polyphaga
- Infraorder: Cucujiformia
- Family: Cerambycidae
- Genus: Mallosia
- Species: M. armeniaca

Binomial name
- Mallosia armeniaca Pic, 1897

Synonyms
- Mallosia angelicae var. armeniaca Pic, 1897; Mallosia caucasica Pic, 1898; Mallosia herminae haiastanica Danilevsky, 2007

= Mallosia armeniaca =

Species of beetle

Mallosia armeniaca is a species of beetle in the family Cerambycidae, that can be found in Armenia and Turkey. The species is hairy and brown coloured. The wings are black with white dots.
