= Mallosia baiocchii =

Scientific classification
- Domain: Eukaryota
- Kingdom: Animalia
- Phylum: Arthropoda
- Class: Insecta
- Order: Coleoptera
- Suborder: Polyphaga
- Infraorder: Cucujiformia
- Family: Cerambycidae
- Genus: Mallosia
- Species: M. baiocchii

Binomial name
- Mallosia baiocchii (Sama, 2000)

Synonyms
- Semnosia baiocchii Sama, 2000

Species of beetle

Mallosia baiocchii is a species of beetle in the family Cerambycidae. It was described by Sama in 2000. It is known from Syria.
