= Mallosia scovitzii =

Scientific classification
- Domain: Eukaryota
- Kingdom: Animalia
- Phylum: Arthropoda
- Class: Insecta
- Order: Coleoptera
- Suborder: Polyphaga
- Infraorder: Cucujiformia
- Family: Cerambycidae
- Genus: Mallosia
- Species: M. scovitzii

Binomial name
- Mallosia scovitzii (Faldermann, 1837)

Synonyms
- Saperda scovitzii Faldermann, 1837; Semnosia scovitzi (Faldermann) Tozlu, Rejzek & Özbek, 2003; Mallosia scowitzi (Faldermann) Pic, 1905 (unjustified emendation)

Species of beetle

Mallosia scovitzii is a species of beetle in the family Cerambycidae. It is found in Armenia, Azerbaijan, Georgia, Turkey, and Iran.

Mallosia scovitzii measure 16–34 mm (0.63–1.34 in) in length. Its host plants are Ferula and Prangos (family Apiaceae).
