= Paolo Baiocco =

Italian footballer (born 1989)

Personal information
- Date of birth: 29 June 1989 (age 37)
- Place of birth: Rome, Italy
- Height: 1.88 m (6 ft 2 in)
- Position: Goalkeeper

Senior career*
Years	Team	Apps	(Gls)
- Atletico Roma
2010–2012	Siracusa	61	(0)
2012–2014	Reggina	40	(0)
2013–2014	→ Benevento (loan)	20	(0)
2014–2015	Matera	15	(0)
2015	Grosseto	19	(0)
2015–2016	Arezzo	34	(0)
2016–2018	Fondi	31	(0)
2018	Pescara	0	(0)
2019	Livorno	0	(0)
2019–2020	Paganese	28	(0)
2020–2021	Perugia	0	(0)
2021–2022	Paganese	50	(0)
- * Club domestic league appearances and goals as of 24 April 2022

Paolo Baiocco (born 29 June 1989) is an Italian professional footballer who plays as a goalkeeper.

== Club career ==
On 27 July 2019, he signed with Paganese.

On 22 September 2020 he joined Perugia. His Perugia contract was terminated by mutual consent on 1 February 2021.

On 9 February 2021, he returned to Paganese.
