= Mama =

Mama is an English nickname for "mother".

Mama(s) or Mamma or Momma or Mummy may also refer to:

== Roles ==
- Mama-san, in Japan and East Asia, a woman in a position of authority

== Places ==
=== Russia ===
- Mama, Russia, an urban locality in Irkutsk Oblast
- Mama Airport, serving the locality
- Mama (river), a river in Irkutsk Oblast

=== Mexico ===
- Mama Municipality, Yucatán

== Anatomy ==
- Mamma (anatomy), the breast in humans
- Mammary gland, the milk-producing organ in female mammals
- Udder, the mammary organ of female quadruped mammals

== Art, entertainment, and media ==
=== People and fictional characters ===
- Mama Fratelli, a character in the 1985 American adventure comedy The Goonies
- Mama Maybelle Harper, a character in the American TV sitcom Gimme a Break!
- Mamas K. Chandran (born 1981), Indian film director, known professionally as Mamas
- Shylo Malsawmtluanga, an Indian footballer nicknamed Mama
- Thelma Harper or "Mama", a fictional character on The Carol Burnett Show and the sitcom Mama's Family
- Mama Thakur, fictional villain in Dilwale
- Mama, from Tattletail

=== Film and television ===
- Ma-ma (1976 film), a Soviet–French–Romanian musical directed by Elisabeta Bostan
- Mamma (1982 film), a Swedish film directed by Suzanne Osten
- Mama (1990 film), a Chinese film directed by Zhang Yuan
- Mama (2013 film), a horror film directed by Andres Muschietti, expanded from his 2008 short Mamá
- Ma Ma (2015 film), a Spanish film directed by Julio Medem
- Mama (2024 film), a Canadian documentary directed by Thea Loo
- Mama (American TV series), a 1949–57 series
- Mama (South Korean TV series), a 2014 series

=== Literature ===
- Mamma, a 1908 novel by Rhoda Broughton
- "Mama", a short story by Dorothy Allison in her 1988 collection Trash: Short Stories
- Mama: Love, Motherhood and Revolution, a 2015 anthology by Antonella Gambotto-Burke
- Momma, a syndicated comic strip

=== Music ===
==== Bands ====
- Momma (band), an American indie rock band

==== Albums ====
- Mama (Brenda Fassie album) or the title song, 1994
- Mama (Nomeansno album), 1982
- Mama (Vitas album), or the title song, 2003
- Mama (EP) or the title song (see below), by EXO-K and EXO-M, 2012
- Mama, an EP by Adrian Eagle, 2019

==== Songs ====
- "Mama" (6ix9ine song), 2018
- "Mama" (B. J. Thomas song), 1966
- "Mama" (Clean Bandit song), 2019
- "Mama" (Exo song), 2012
- "Mama" (Genesis song), 1983
- "Mama" (Jonas Blue song), 2017
- "Mama" (My Chemical Romance song), 2006
- "Mama (Loves a Crackhead)", by Plan B, 2006
- "Mama" (Spice Girls song), 1997
- "Mama (Ana Ahabak)", by Christina Stürmer, 2003
- "Mama" (Vladimir Arzumanyan song), Armenia entry in the Junior Eurovision Song Contest 2010
- "Mamas" (song), by Anne Wilson and Hillary Scott, 2022
- "Mamma" (song), an Italian song, 1940
- "Mama", by Alabama Shakes from Boys & Girls, 2012
- "Mama", by Alma from Have U Seen Her?, 2020
- "Mama", by Ant Wan, 2019
- "Mama", by Beth Hart from Screamin' for My Supper, 1999
- "Mama", by Brymo from Oṣó, 2018
- "Mama", by BTS from Wings, 2016
- "Mama", by Chris Brown from Exclusive, 2007
- "Mama", by Doda from Aquaria (physical reissue edition), 2022
- "Mama", by Electric Light Orchestra from ELO 2, 1973
- "Mama", by Ella Eyre and Banx & Ranx, 2019
- "Mama", by Godsmack from IV, 2006
- "Mama", by Helen Reddy from Music, Music, 1976
- "Mama", by Il Divo from Il Divo, 2004
- "Mama", by the Kelly Family, 1999
- "Mama", by Kiss Daniel from New Era, 2016
- "Mama", by Kim Appleby from Kim Appleby, 1990
- "Mama", by The Lonely Island from Turtleneck & Chain, 2011
- "Mama", by Lyfe Jennings from I Still Believe, 2010
- "Mama", by Mayorkun from The Mayor of Lagos, 2018
- "Mama", by Oingo Boingo from Boi-ngo, 1986
- "Mama", by the Sugarcubes from Life's Too Good, 1988
- "Mama", by The-Dream from Love Hate, 2007
- "Mamá", by Timbiriche from La Banda Timbiriche, 1982
- "Mama", by Toto from Hydra, 1979
- "Mama", by Trina from The One, 2019
- "Mama", by Umberto Tozzi, a B-side of "Gloria", 1979
- "Mama", by Yemi Alade from Mama Africa, 2016
- "M.A.M.A", by Nana Mizuki from Alive & Kicking, 2004
- "Momma", by Kendrick Lamar, from To Pimp a Butterfly, 2015
- "Momma", by Joyner Lucas, featuring Chris Brown, from ADHD 2, 2025

==== Other music ====
- MAMA Records, an American record label
- Mnet Asian Music Awards, an annual South Korean music awards show
- MTV Africa Music Awards, a continental music awards show

=== Other entertainment ===
- Mama (magazine), a Swedish magazine
- Mama (1966), a stage musical by Mbongeni Ngema

== Brands and enterprises ==
- MAMA Festivals, a UK live-venue and event management company
- MAMA Gallery, an art gallery in Los Angeles, California
- MAMMA., Modernist Architects of Morocco Memorial Association
- Murray Art Museum Albury, New South Wales, Australia
- Museum of Modern Art of Algiers, Algeria
- Mama, a brand of instant noodles by Thai President Foods

== Computing and technology ==
- Mama (software), an object-oriented programming language
- Mamma.com, a metasearch engine operated by Copernic

== Religion and mythology ==
- Mammes of Caesarea or Mammas (259–275), semi-legendary child-martyr of the 3rd century
- Mami (goddess) or Mama, a goddess in the Babylonian epic Atra-Hasis
- Ninhursag or Mamma, a Sumerian earth goddess

== Other uses ==
- Areca nut or momma, a stimulant drug in Asia and Oceania
- Mamma cloud, or mammatus cloud, a type of cloud
- Mama language, a Bantu language of Nigeria
- Mama and papa, in linguistics, the sequences of sounds corresponding to the words for "mother" and "father"
- Mama or sugar mama, an older partner in a transactional relationship
- Mama (wasp), a genus of wasps in the tribe Euphorini

== See also ==
- Baby mama (disambiguation)
- Big Bad Mamma, a track from the soundtrack to the 1997 film, How to Be a Player
- La Mama (disambiguation)
- Lil Mama (born 1989), American hip hop recording artist
- Ma (disambiguation)
- Mama's Family, American sitcom
- Mamak (disambiguation)
- Ma-Mha, a 2007 Thai film
- Mame (disambiguation)
- Mami (disambiguation)
- Mamma mia (disambiguation)
- "Mamo" (song), by Anastasia Prikhodko, Russia's 2009 Eurovision entry
- Maternal insult or "yo mama joke"
- Mom (disambiguation)
- Mommy (disambiguation)
- Mother (disambiguation)
- Mummy (disambiguation)
- Suga Mama (disambiguation)
- That's My Mama, American television sitcom
