= Mom (disambiguation) =

Mom is a colloquial term for a mother.

Mom, Moms, MOM, MoM, or M.O.M may also refer to:

== Film and television ==
- Ministry of Mayhem, a British children's television show (MoM)
- Mom (film), a 2017 Indian thriller drama film
- Mom (TV series), an American situation comedy
- "Mom" (Abbott Elementary), a TV episode
- Moms (film), a 2012 Russian anthology film
- "The Moms", an episode of 30 Rock
- M.O.M.S — Mhies on a Mission, a Philippine talk show
- M.O.M. Mothers of Monsters, 2025 horror film
- Moms (talk show), a Philippine television talk show

=== Characters ===
- Mom (Futurama), a character in the TV series Futurama
- Mom, a character in the film Holes
- Mom, a fish on the American television talk show FishCenter Live
- Mom (Dexter's Laboratory), a character from the animated series Dexter's Laboratory

== Information technology ==
- Management Object Model, in high-level architecture parlance
- Message-oriented middleware, a category of communications software
- Microsoft Operations Manager, a network management product

== Literature ==
- Ministry of Magic, the Government for the Magical community of Britain and Ireland in the Harry Potter franchise
- "Mom" (short story), a Thai short story by Kukrit Pramoj

== Music ==
- Methods of Mayhem, an American rapcore band (MoM)
- Mouse on Mars, an electronic music duo from Germany (MoM)
- Moms (album), a 2012 album by Menomena
- "Mom" (Bonnie Tyler song), 2013; covered by Garth Brooks, 2014
- "Mom" (Earth, Wind & Fire song), 1972
- "Mom" (Meghan Trainor song), 2016
- MOM: Music for Our Mother Ocean, a series of 1990s alternative-rock charity albums

== Organizations ==
- Maison de l'Orient et de la Méditerranée, a research body in France, specializing in the ancient Mediterranean and Middle East
- Medicaid Obstetrical and Maternal Services, a program in New York State Department of Health
- Methodist Overseas Mission, a division of the Methodist Church of Australasia that ran missions from the 1930s to around 1980
- Ministry of General Machine-Building, a Soviet government ministry overseeing rocket technology
- Ministry of Manpower (Singapore), a governmental organization in Singapore (MoM)
- MOM Brands, formerly Malt-O-Meal, American breakfast cereal company
- Mothers Organized for Moral Stability, a 1960s socially conservative American organization
- Militia of Montana American nationalist paramilitary organization

== People ==
=== Nickname or first name ===
- Mom Boucher (1953–2022), Canadian convicted murderer and Hells Angels member
- Moms Mabley (1894–1975), African American comedian

=== Surname ===
- Arturo S. Mom (1893–?), Argentine screenwriter and film director
- Mom Chim Huy (1939–2025), Cambodian politician
- Mom Soth, Cambodian film actor
- Mark Mom (born 1974), Papua New Guinean rugby league footballer
- Rady Mom (born 1970), Cambodian-born American politician

== Science and mathematics ==
- Method of moments, any of several mathematical methods
- Methoxymethane, an ether
- Methoxymethyl, see chloromethyl methyl ether
- Milk of magnesia (MoM), a suspension of magnesium hydroxide in water
- Modular Ocean Model, a numerical model for studying the global ocean climate system

== Transportation ==
- Mars Orbiter Mission, an Indian spacecraft
- Monmouth Ocean Middlesex Line, a proposed New Jersey Transit rail line

== Other uses ==
- City Municipality of Maribor (Slovene: Mestna občina Maribor), a local government area in Slovenia
- Mall of Memphis, a defunct mall in Memphis, Tennessee (MoM)
- Manufacturing operations management, a methodology for optimization of manufacturing operations
- Master of Magic, a 1994 fantasy turn-based strategy computer game (MoM)
- Member of the National Order of Merit (Republic of Malta)
- Member of the Order of Merit of the Police Forces, a Canadian award
- Memory of Mankind, a preservation project to preserve the knowledge about present human civilization
- Minions of Mirth, an MMORPG by Prairie Games (MoM)
- Minutes of meeting, instant written record of a meeting or hearing (MoM)
- MOM, acronym for American professional wrestling tag team Men on a Mission
- mom, the abbreviation for the obsolete unit of length myriometre
- Mom (royal title), a Thai royal title
- Multiple of the median (MoM)

== See also ==
- Mister Mom (disambiguation)
- Mommy (disambiguation)
- Mum (disambiguation)
- Mummy (disambiguation)
- Mother (disambiguation)
- Mama (disambiguation)
- Ma (disambiguation)
