= Mother Night (disambiguation) =

Mother Night is a 1962 novel by Kurt Vonnegut

Mother Night may also refer to:

- Mother Night (film), a 1996 U.S. romantic war drama film, based on the Kurt Vonnegut novel
- 'Mother Night' (character), a Marvel Comics character

== See also ==
- Mōdraniht (English: Mothers' Night), an Anglo-Saxon pagan festival
- Night Mother (disambiguation)
- Mother (disambiguation)
- Night (disambiguation)
