= Mommy =

Mommy is a colloquial term for a mother. It may also refer to:

- Mommy (1995 film), an American thriller
- Mommy (2014 film), a Canadian melodrama
- Mommy (album), by Be Your Own Pet, 2023
- "Mommy" (American Horror Story), a 2015 TV episode
- Mommy (tortoise), a tortoise at the Philadelphia Zoo that gave birth at age 97
- The Mommies (comedy duo), an American female comedy duo
- The Mommies (TV series), a 1993–1995 American sitcom

== See also ==
- Mommy Mommy, a 2007 Canadian documentary film
- Momy, a commune in France
- Mummy (disambiguation)
- Mother (disambiguation)
- Mama (disambiguation)
- Mom (disambiguation)
- Ma (disambiguation)
