= Ma Ma =

Ma Ma can refer to:

- Ma-ma (1976 film), a 1976 Romanian film
- Ma Ma (2015 film), a 2015 Spanish film

== See also ==
- Mama
