= Night Mother =

Night, Mother or 'Night, Mother may refer to:

- 'night, Mother (play), a 1982 U.S. stageplay by Marsha Norman
- 'night, Mother (film), a 1986 U.S. film based on the 1982 play
- "Night, Mother" (CSI: NY), a 2004 season 1 number 10 episode 10 of U.S. TV series CSI:New York

== See also ==
- Mōdraniht (English: Night of the Mothers), an Anglo-Saxon pagan festival
- Mother Night (disambiguation)
- Mother (disambiguation)
- Night (disambiguation)
