= The Mother =

The Mother may refer to:

- Mother (Gorky novel), 1906
- The Mother (Brecht play), 1935, based on Gorky's novel
- The Mother (Pearl S. Buck novel), 1934
- The Mother (Čapek play), 1938
- The Mother (TV play), 1954, by Paddy Chayefsky
- The Mother (Zeller play), a 2010 play by Florian Zeller
- The Mother (2003 film), directed by Roger Michell
- The Mother (2023 film), an American action film
- Mirra Alfassa (1878–1973), spiritual guru and collaborator with Sri Aurobindo
  - The Mother (Sri Aurobindo), a book about Alfassa by Aurobindo
- The Mother (How I Met Your Mother), a fictional television character

== See also ==
- The Mothers, an American rock band
- The Great Mother, a 1955 book on the archetype by Erich Neumann
- Mother (disambiguation)
