= Baby Daddy (disambiguation) =

Baby Daddy is an American sitcom created by Dan Berendsen that premiered in 2012.

Baby Daddy may also refer to:

- The father of a child, like baby mama
- "Baby Daddy", a song by American rapper Hopsin from the 2010 album Raw
- "Baby Daddy", a 2017 song by Afro-Puerto Rican rapper Joseline Hernandez
- "Baby Daddy", a song by American rapper Lil Yachty from the 2018 album Lil Boat 2

== See also ==
- Babydaddy, a musician
- My Baby Daddy, a song by B-Rock and the Bizz
- Bloody Daddy, a 2023 Indian film by Ali Abbas Zafar
- Baby mama (disambiguation)
- Sugar daddy (disambiguation)
