= Mummy (disambiguation) =

A mummy is an unusually well preserved corpse.

Mummy or The Mummy may also refer to:

== Places ==
- Mummy Range, a mountain range in the Rocky Mountains of northern Colorado in the US
- Mummy Cave, a rock shelter and archeological site in Park County, Wyoming, US, near the eastern entrance to Yellowstone National Park
- Mummy ride, a dark ride at three theme parks based on the film franchise

== People ==
- Ray Schoenke, American football player nicknamed "The Mummy"
- Joe D'Acquisto, professional wrestler nicknamed "The Mummy"
- Joe Lycett, who is also known by the self-given moniker "Mummy"

== Arts and entertainment ==
=== Film ===
- The Mummy (1911 film), American movie made by the Thanhouser Company
- The Mummy (franchise), an American horror/adventure film series by Universal
  - The Mummy (1932 film), American movie starring Boris Karloff as Imhotep/Ardath Bey
  - The Mummy (1959 film), British remake of Universal's Mummy films starring Christopher Lee as Kharis
  - The Mummy (1999 film), first Universal Pictures remake of their earlier 1932 film
  - The Mummy (2017 film), second remake of the 1932 film, and "reboot" of the 1999 version, starring Tom Cruise
  - Lee Cronin's The Mummy (2026 film), American supernatural horror film
- The Night of Counting the Years (also released as The Mummy), 1969 Egyptian film directed by Shadi Abdel Salam
- Tale of the Mummy, 1998 British-American horror film
- Mummy (2016 film), Indian Kannada-language film
- Mummies (2023 film), English-language Spanish 3D animated film
- Pizza 3: The Mummy, 2023 Indian horror film

=== Literature ===
- Mummies, a 1972 non-fiction book by Georgess McHargue
- Mummies: A Voyage Through Eternity, a 1991 illustrated book by Françoise Dunand and Roger Lichtenberg
- Mummy! A Chrestomathy of Cryptology, a 1980 anthology edited by Bill Pronzini
- Mummy, a 2000 novel by Caroline B. Cooney
- The Mummy! A Tale of the Twenty-Second Century, an 1827 novel by Jane C. Loudon
- The Mummy. A Handbook of Egyptian Funerary Archaeology, an 1893 non-fiction book by Egyptologist E. A. Wallis Budge
- The Mummy, a 1981 novelization of the 1932 film by Julian May under the pen name Ian Thorne
- The Mummy, or Ramses the Damned, a 1989 novel by Anne Rice

=== Other arts and entertainment ===
- Funeral of a Mummy on the Nile, 1877 painting by Frederick Arthur Bridgman
- Mummy (undead), a popular trope of horror fiction
- "The Mummy", Get Smart season 2, episode 20 (1967)
- "The Mummy", Voyage to the Bottom of the Sea season 3, episode 20 (1967)
- The Mummy (1999 soundtrack), the soundtrack to the 1999 film The Mummy
- The Mummy (2017 soundtrack), the soundtrack to the 2017 film The Mummy
- The Mummy (TV series), based on the film franchise
- The Mummy (video game), a 2000 action-adventure game based on the film franchise
- The Mummy, a 1999 radio-drama produced by Radio Tales for National Public Radio
- "The Mummy", a song by JJ Lin from the album No. 89757
- "The Mummy", a song by Massacration from the album Good Blood Headbanguers
- The Mummies, 1980s American garage punk band

== Other uses ==
- Mummia, a substance also known as "mummy"
- Mummy brown, a pigment claimed to be made from mummies
- Mummy paper, a paper claimed to be made from mummies
- Mummy wasp, wasp of the genus Aleiodes
- Mummification (BDSM), a bondage practice

== See also ==
- Mom (disambiguation)
- Mommy (disambiguation)
- Mother (disambiguation)
- Mum (disambiguation)
