= Mothers (disambiguation) =

Mothers is the plural form of mother.

Mothers may also refer to:

== Film ==
- Mothers (2010 film), a Macedonian film by Milčo Mančevski
- Mothers (2017 Italian film), directed by Liana Marabini
- Mothers (2017 South Korean film), directed by Lee Dong-eun

== Music ==
- Mothers (album), by Swim Deep, 2015
- Mothers (band), an American folk rock band
- The Mothers of Invention or just The Mothers, an American rock band led by Frank Zappa
- Mothers (music venue), a former club in Birmingham, England

== Other uses ==
- Mothers (Tokyo Stock Exchange), a market of the Tokyo Stock Exchange
- Mother's Cookies, a food brand owned by Kellogg
- The Mothers (novel), by Brit Bennett, 2016
- "The Mothers" (The Amazing World of Gumball), an episode of the British-American animated television series The Amazing World of Gumball

== See also ==
- Mother (disambiguation)
