= Mister Mom (disambiguation) =

Mr. Mom is a 1983 American comedy film.

Mister Mom or variation, may also refer to:

- "Mr. Mom" (song), by Lonestar, 2004
- "Mr. Mom", a 2008 TV episode of Kate Plus 8
- "Mister Mom", a 2010 TV episode of Dog the Bounty Hunter that marked the return of Tim Chapman
- Mister Mama, a South Korean film of 1992

== See also ==
- Mister (disambiguation)
- Mom (disambiguation)
- Stay-at-home dad
- Single parent
- Working parent
- "Mr. Mom/Mrs. Superstar", a 2010 TV episode of The Family Crews
- Meet Mister Mom a TV3 program in Norway
