= Mamak =

Mamak may refer to:

- Mamak people, Indian Tamil Muslims of Malaysia
  - Mamak stall, a type of food establishment that serves mamak food
  - Mamak rojak (or Indian rojak), the Malaysian version of a dish commonly prepared in Malaysia, Singapore, and Indonesia
  - Mamak Gang, a Malaysian gang active since the early 1990s
  - Mamak Puteh (born 1984), Malaysian actor and comedian
- Mamak, a Persian language term meaning "little mother" or "kind and compassionate mother"
- Mamak, Ankara, a district of Ankara, Turkey
- Mamak (or "mamaq", from Hebrew: ממ"ק), a floor-level protected space

== See also ==
- Mama (disambiguation)
