= Kukrit Pramoj =

Prime Minister of Thailand from 1975 to 1976

Mom Rajawongse Kukrit Pramoj PCh MPCh MVM
- คึกฤทธิ์ ปราโมช
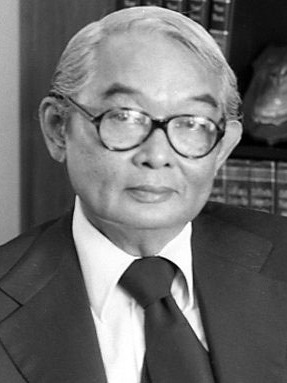
- Kukrit in 1974

13th Prime Minister of Thailand
- In office 14 March 1975 – 20 April 1976
- Monarch: Bhumibol Adulyadej
- Preceded by: Seni Pramoj
- Succeeded by: Seni Pramoj

Minister of Interior
- In office 8 January 1976 – 20 April 1976
- Prime Minister: himself
- Preceded by: Seni Pramoj
- Succeeded by: Boonteng Thongsawat

12th President of the National Assembly of Thailand
- In office 29 December 1973 – 7 October 1974
- Preceded by: Siri Siriyothin
- Succeeded by: Praphas Ouchai

Personal details
- Born: 20 April 1911 Sing Buri, Krung Kao, Siam (now In Buri, Sing Buri, Thailand)
- Died: 9 October 1995 (aged 84) Khlong Toei, Bangkok, Thailand (now Watthana, Bangkok, Thailand)
- Cause of death: Heart disease and high blood pressure
- Party: Social Action Party
- Other political affiliations: Democrat (1946–1948)
- Spouse: M.L. Pakpring Thongyai (Separated)
- Children: 2
- Education: The Queen's College, Oxford
- Profession: Scholar; writer; politician; army officer
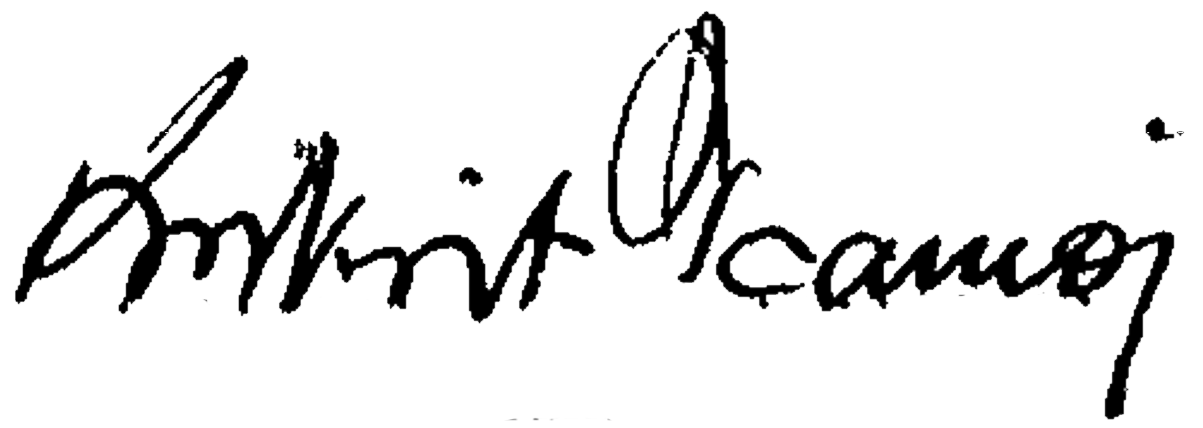
- Signature

Military service
- Allegiance: Thailand
- Branch/service: Royal Thai Army
- Rank: Major General
- Commands: Royal Thai Aide-De-Camp
- Battles/wars: Pacific War

Mom Rajawongse Kukrit Pramoj (Thai: คึกฤทธิ์ ปราโมช, RTGS: Khuek-rit Pramot, pronounced [kʰɯ́k.rít prāː.môːt]; 20 April 1911 – 9 October 1995) was a Thai politician, author, scholar and professor. He was Speaker of the House of Representatives of Thailand between 1973 and 1974. He was the thirteenth Prime Minister of Thailand, serving in office from 1975 to 1976 between his brother Seni Pramoj's terms. Being the great-grandson of King Rama II, he was a member of the Thai royal family. He also portrayed the Prime Minister of the fictional country of Sarkhan in the 1963 motion picture The Ugly American with Marlon Brando.

== Biography ==
He was born on 20 April 1911 in Sing Buri Province into a cadet branch of the Chakri Dynasty with Chinese ancestry. The son of Brigadier General Prince Khamrob and his wife Daeng (Bunnag), his older brother was M.R. Seni Pramoj while his great-grandmother, Ampha, was of Chinese descent and was a consort of Rama II. He served as a corporal during the Franco-Thai War in 1940. As was common for members of Thailand's upper classes at the time, he was educated abroad; he attended school in England at Trent College, before reading philosophy, politics, and economics at The Queen's College, Oxford.

Upon returning to Thailand, he began his career in banking, but his true vocation was his mastery of many forms of arts, including politics and journalism. Put off by Hollywood's portrayal of King Mongkut in the 1946 film Anna and the King of Siam (based on the semi-fictional biographical novel of the same name) Kukrit and his brother, Seni Pramoj, wrote The King of Siam Speaks in 1948. They sent their manuscript to the American politician and diplomat Abbot Low Moffat who drew on it for his biography entitled Mongkut the King of Siam (ISBN 974-8298-12-4), and in 1961, donated the Pramoj manuscript to the Southeast Asian Collection, Asian Division, Library of Congress. He wrote for Siam Rath, the newspaper that he founded.

As a means of showing how Thai society adjusted to life in modern society, in 1953 Kukrit began a series of stories on the life and times of fictional Mae Ploy (Thai: แม่พลอย). who as a young girl enters the service of a princess of Rama V's Royal Household, and dies the same day as Rama VIII. This story was to be one of many that were published in the Kukrit's Siam Rath. His satirical sense and unique sense of humour offered an incisive view of the times Kukrit chronicled. As a scholar, he also wrote many non-fiction works ranging from history and religion to astrology. Most notable are his epics and many short stories portraying various aspects of life and documenting contemporary history. His Many Lives (หลายชีวิต, Lai Chiwit) was also translated into English. He was a leading authority on traditional Thai culture and had a polymathic range of interests from Thailand's classical dance to literature. Most famous for his literary works, he was named a National Artist of Thailand for literature in 1985, the inaugural year for the honour. And he received The Special Commemorative Prize of The Fukuoka Asian Culture Prizes in 1990, the inaugural year for the prizes again. His works encompass many subjects from humour to drama. He was also known as a staunch royalist and served the monarchy for his entire life. He is considered one of the great statesmen of Thailand. His former home is now a heritage museum which is preserved; paying homage to his life and Thai traditions.

He was married to M.R. Pakpring Thongyai with whom he had two children, a son and daughter. He died on 9 October 1995.

== Achievements ==
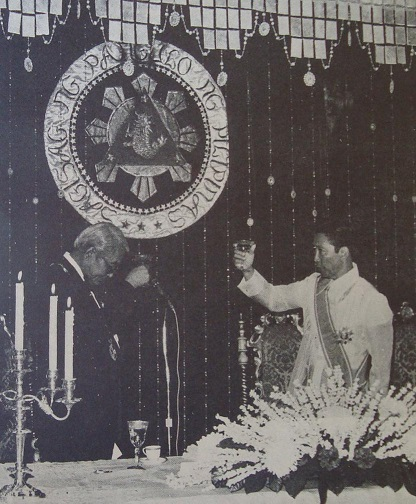
Philippine President Ferdinand Marcos (right) hosts a State Dinner at Malacañang Palace for Kukrit Pramoj (left), July 1975.

- He established the Social Action Party.
- M.R. Kukrit founded the Progress Party in 1946 and was elected to the first post-World War II Parliament.
- Appeared on screen with Marlon Brando in the movie The Ugly American (1963), in which he played Prime Minister Kwen Sai and spoke both Thai and English.
- As Prime Minister, established diplomatic ties with China in 1975, and supervised the withdrawal of American forces from Thailand after the Vietnam War.
- Named National Artist in Literature 1985.
- Received the Fukuoka Asian Culture Prize in 1990.
- Founded the Khon Thammasat Troupe at Thammasat University, Khon being the highest form of dance drama in Thai classical dramatic arts.

=== Acting career ===
When George Englund decided to use Thailand as the location for the fictional country portrayed in his film The Ugly American, Kukrit was appointed as cultural advisor to make sure the film accurately portrayed monarchy in a Buddhist country. Englund had difficulty casting the part of the fictional Prime Minister, but he was so impressed by Kukrit's cultural refinement and mastery of English that he offered him the part, saying, "I can't think of anyone who could play it better." Kukrit accepted, saying, according to Englund, "We are all actors anyway, and I think you're right that I could play it better than anyone." Probably because of this, after he became a real-life Prime Minister of Thailand in 1975, the word "Sarkhan" has entered the Thai language as a nickname of Thailand itself, often with a slight self-deprecating or mocking tone.

== M.R. Kukrit Heritage Home ==
The home that M.R. Kukrit built for himself in Bangkok has been registered by the Department of Fine Arts as 'Home of an Important Person'. It is open to the public on Saturdays, Sundays and official Thai holidays. Standing in 2 acres (8,100 m^{2}) of land, surrounded by landscaped gardens, the house is a similar concept to the Jim Thompson House in Bangkok. Five small traditional Thai houses were dismantled and reassembled at the present site to make one house. The house is filled with artefacts and books collected by the owner. Additions to the original house include air conditioning, a modern bathroom, and a lift was installed when the owner became too frail to climb up and down stairs. The M.R. Kukrit Heritage Home is situated at 19 Soi Phra Pinit, South Sathorn Road, Sathon District, Bangkok 10120.

== Literary works ==
=== Literary career ===
Kukrit Pramoj is perhaps best known in Thailand for his literary production, particularly his novel Four Reigns, which was published as a serial in his newspaper Siam Rat in 1950. Four Reigns tells the story of "Mae Ploi," a young girl who grew up in the court of King Chulalongkorn (Rama V) where she was an attendant to one of the princesses. Kukrit extends her story after her marriage during the reign of Rama VI, and in the process tells the story of mid-twentieth century Thailand through Mae Ploi's eyes. The story includes the reigns of four Kings of the Chakri dynasty (thus the title "Four Reigns"), and the 1932 Revolution against the absolute monarchy. Four Reigns was translated into English by Tulachandra. The Thai version of Four Reigns continues to be well known to Thais in the twenty-first century because it has been used in Thai schools, and has been produced as a well-known films.

Only two other of Kukrit's many novels, Many Lives, and Red Bamboo are translated into English. In addition, there is a compilation of a few of Kukrit's English language writings and interviews, M. R. Kukrit Pramoj, His Wit and Wisdom, compiled by Vilas Manivat, and edited by Steve Van Beek. However, Kukrit's writings in the Thai language are voluminous, and include both fiction and non-fiction. Much of Kukrit's writing was first published as either columns or serials in the Siam Rat. A number of the books serialized and later turned into books including Four Reigns. A wide range of subjects were addressed in these books, including contemporary politics, Kukrit's love of dogs, Thai history, Southeast Asian history, elephants, a history of the Jews, and many other subjects. A review of his book comparing feudalism in Thailand called sakdina and Britain was recently published in English. Kukrit's essay is called "Farang Sakdina." The article describes Kukrit's views about good governance, monarchy, and democracy in Thailand and Britain.

=== Novels ===
- Sam Kok Chabap Nai Thun (สามก๊กฉบับนายทุน; 1951) ISBN 974-9906-16-0
- Phai Daeng (ไผ่แดง; 1954) ISBN 974-9906-18-7
  - Based on Giovannino Guareschi's 1950 novel The Little World of Don Camillo. Translated into English as Red Bamboo in 1961
- Su Si Thai Hao (ซูสีไทเฮา; 1957) ISBN 974-9906-15-2
- Jew (ยิว; 1967) ISBN 974-9906-22-5
- Four Reigns (สี่แผ่นดิน) ISBN 974-9906-20-9
  - Translated into English as Four Reigns in 1981 by Tulachandra; ISBN 974-7100-66-5
- Kawao Thi Bang Phleng (กาเหว่าที่บางเพลง; 1989) ISBN 974-9906-19-5
  - Based on John Wyndham's 1957 science fiction novel The Midwich Cuckoos. Adapted into a film of the same name in 1994.
- Lai Chiwit (หลายชีวิต) ISBN 974-690-119-2
  - Translated in English as Many Lives in 1996; ISBN 974-7100-67-3
- Khun Chang Khun Phaen (ขุนช้างขุนแผน; 1989) ISBN 974-690-166-4

=== Plays ===
- Rashomon (ราโชมอน) ISBN 974-9906-33-0
  - Based on Akira Kurosawa's 1950 crime mystery film of the same name.

=== Collected short stories and essays ===
- Phuean Non (เพื่อนนอน; short stories, 1952) ISBN 974-9906-31-4
  - "Mom" (มอม, published individually in 2011) ISBN 9789746908023
- Sapphehera Khadi (สัพเพเหระคดี) ISBN 974-92321-6-X

=== Non-fiction ===
- Phama Sia Mueang (พม่าเสียเมือง; 1967) ISBN 974-9906-27-6, ISBN 974-690-030-7
- Huang Mahannop (ห้วงมหรรณพ; 1959) ISBN 974-690-060-9
- Chak Yipun (ฉากญี่ปุ่น; 1962) ISBN 974-9906-28-4
- Mueang Maya (เมืองมายา; 1965) ISBN 974-690-352-7
- Khon Rak Ma (คนรักหมา; 1967) ISBN 974-690-102-8
- Wai Run (วัยรุ่น; 1980) ISBN 974-9906-32-2
- Thammakhadi (ธรรมคดี; 1983) ISBN 974-9906-30-6
- Khrong Kraduk Nai Tu (โครงกระดูกในตู้) ISBN 974-690-131-1
- Chao Lok (เจ้าโลก) ISBN 974-9906-26-8
- Kritsadaphinihan An Bot Bang Mi Dai (กฤษฎาภินิหารอันบดบังมิได้) ISBN 974-690-189-3, ISBN 974-9906-35-7
- Chang Nai Chiwit Khong Phom (ช้างในชีวิตของผม) ISBN 974-690-514-7
- Phra Phutthasatsana Kap Khuekrit (พระพุทธศาสนากับคึกฤทธิ์) ISBN 974-93364-1-0
- Kho Khit Rueang Koet Kae Chep Tai (ข้อคิดเรื่อง เกิด แก่ เจ็บ ตาย) ISBN 974-690-382-9
- Songkhram Phio (สงครามผิว) ISBN 974-9906-25-X
- Thok Khamen (ถกเขมร) ISBN 974-690-105-2
- Banthoeng Roeng Rom (บันเทิงเริงรมย์) ISBN 974-9906-29-2
- Rueang Kham Khan (เรื่องขำขัน) ISBN 974-690-507-4
- Kep Lek Phasom Noi (เก็บเล็กผสมน้อย) ISBN 974-690-489-2
- Klai Rok (ไกลโรค) ISBN 974-690-479-5
- Khon Khong Lok (คนของโลก) ISBN 974-9906-24-1
- Chom Suan (ชมสวน) ISBN 974-9906-34-9
- Talat Nat (ตลาดนัด) ISBN 974-690-482-5
- Tham Haeng Ariya (ธรรมแห่งอริยะ) ISBN 974-690-473-6
- Nam Phrik (น้ำพริก) ISBN 974-690-483-3
- Beng Hek Phu Thuk Kluen Thang Pen (เบ้งเฮ็ก ผู้ถูกกลืนทั้งเป็น; 2001 [Revised]) ISBN 974-9906-17-9
- Arokhaya (อโรคยา) ISBN 974-690-335-7
- Sappha Sat (สรรพสัตว์) ISBN 974-690-444-2
- Khon Khong Lok (คนของโลก; 1967) ISBN 974-9906-24-1
- Farang Sakdina (1957-1958)
- M. R. Kukrit Pramoj, His Wit and Wisdom (Writings, Speeches, Interviews) 1983. Compiled by Vilas Manivat, Edited by Steve Van Beek. Editions Duang Kamol. OCLC 10485390
- The King of Siam Speaks, by Seni Pramoj and Kukrit Pramoj ISBN 974-8298-12-4

Most Thai were shocked by the portrayal of their revered nineteenth-century king, Mongkut, in the musical The King and I. The stage and screen versions were based on Margaret Landon's 1944 book entitled Anna and the King of Siam. To correct the record, well-known Thai intellectuals Seni and Kukrit Pramoj wrote this account in 1948. The Pramoj brothers sent their manuscript to the American politician and diplomat Abbot Low Moffat (1901-1996), who drew on it for his biography entitled Mongkut the King of Siam (1961) ISBN 974-8298-12-4. Moffat donated the Pramoj manuscript to the United States Library of Congress in 1961. (Southeast Asian Collection, Asian Division, Library of Congress)

=== Translations ===
- Jonathan Livingston Seagull by Richard Bach, translated as Jonathan Livingston Nang Nuan (จอนะธัน ลิวิงสตัน นางนวล; 1973)

== Honours ==
=== National honours ===
- Thailand :
  - Knight Grand Cross (First Class) of The Most Illustrious Order of Chula Chom Klao
  - Knight Grand Cordon (Special Class) of The Most Exalted Order of the White Elephant
  - Knight Grand Cordon (Special Class) of The Most Noble Order of the Crown of Thailand
  - Victory Medal - Pacific War
  - Freeman Safeguarding Medal, 1st Class
  - Dushdi Mala Medal Pin of Arts and Science (Civilian)
  - Boy Scout Citation Medal of Vajira, First Class
  - King Rama IX Rajaruchi Medal, Gold Medal
  - King Rama IX Royal Cypher Medal, First Class
  - King Rama IX Coronation Medal
  - 25th Buddhist Century Celebration Medal
  - Red Cross Medal of Merit

=== Foreign honours ===
- Denmark :
  - Grand Cross of the Order of the Dannebrog
- Francoist Spain :
  - Grand Cross of the Order of Civil Merit
- Netherlands :
  - Knight Grand Cross of the Order of Orange-Nassau
- Philippines :
  - Grand Collar of the Order of Sikatuna
- Indonesia :
  - Star of the Republic of Indonesia, 2nd class
- Mexico :
  - Grand Cross of the Order of the Aztec Eagle
- Portugal :
  - Grand Cross of the Order of Prince Henry
- Belgium :
  - Grand Officer of the Order of the Crown
- France :
  - Grand Officer of the Order of the Black Star
- Luxembourg :
  - Grand Officer of the Order of Adolphe of Nassau
- Italy :
  - Grand Officer of the Order of Merit of the Italian Republic
- Malaysia:
  - Honorary Grand Commander of the Order of the Defender of the Realm
- Norway :
  - Commander with Star of the Order of St. Olav
- Sweden :
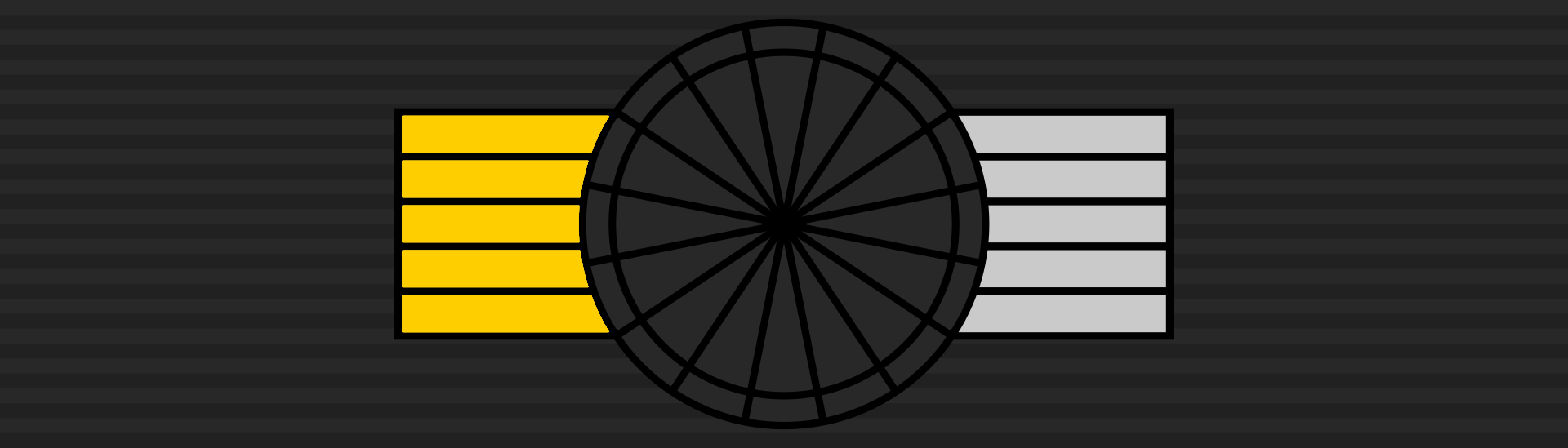
  - Commander 1st Class of the Order of the Polar Star

=== Academic rank ===
- Professor of Thammasat University

=== Other awards ===
- Japan: Recipient of the Fukuoka Prize, 1990

== See also ==
- Seni Pramoj
- Four Reigns

Political offices
Preceded by Seni Pramoj	Prime Minister of Thailand; 1975–1976	Succeeded by Seni Pramoj
