= Wendell Cherry =

American lawyer, entrepreneur, art collector and patron

- Born: July 28, 1851; Hart County, Kentucky
- Died: July 16, 1991 (aged 55); Louisville, Kentucky
- Occupation: Entrepreneur
- Known for: Co-founder of Humana
- Spouse: Dorothy O'Connell (m. 1977)
- Children: Angela Gehegan, Alison Alvarez, Andrew Cherry, and Hagan Cherry.
- Parent(s): Layman and Geneva Cherry
- Family: Layman Cherry (brother); Ruth Anna Holland (sister); Sue Ellen Lloyd (sister)

Wendell Cherry (September 25, 1935 – July 16, 1991) was an American lawyer, entrepreneur, art collector, and patron. The company he co-founded, Humana, grew under his leadership to become the largest hospital operator in the United States. In the 1980s, he also built one of the country's most important art collections.

== Life and career ==
Cherry was born in 1935 in Horse Cave, a rural community in Kentucky, to a grocery wholesaler, Layman S. Cherry, and his wife, Geneva (born Spillman). He went to Caverna High School and graduated in 1953. He attended the University of Kentucky and was a member of Kappa Sigma fraternity, studied business administration and graduated in 1957. He graduated with a Bachelor of Laws in 1959 and was ranked first in his class. At this time, Cherry was already serving as chief editor of the Kentucky Law Journal. He became an associate at the law firm Wyatt, Grafton, & Sloss. He would also later teach economics at the University of Louisville. In 1959, he met David Jones, in an interview Wyatt, Grafton & Sloss. He would become his business partner and, later, co-founder of Humana.

Cherry died on July 16, 1991, at his home in Louisville due to lung cancer.

=== Family ===
Cherry first married Mary Elizabeth Baird. Then married interior designer Dorothy O'Connell, and lived in Louisville and New York.

=== Sports promoter ===
Cherry belonged in the 1960s to a group of citizens from Louisville, who supported Louisville native Cassius Clay (later known as Muhammad Ali) in his early heavyweight boxing career. He worked as a lawyer for the group, collecting money from the sponsors for Clay. He was also the co-owner and president of the Kentucky Colonels basketball franchise.

=== Art collector ===
The American art magazine Art & Antiques named Cherry in 1985 among the 100 most important art collectors of the United States. The reputation of his collection was not only because of the quality of the works, but also for the sometimes very high prices that he paid for these pictures and scored from subsequent sales. A record-breaking example of these works was Pablo Picasso's self-portrait Yo, Picasso. Cherry purchased the picture in 1981 at Sotheby's for $5.3 million, at the time the highest amount ever paid for a Picasso painting.

=== Philanthropy ===
Cherry was one of the driving forces in establishing The Kentucky Center for the Performing Arts in 1983 and became its first chairman. From 1980 to 1987, he led this institution as CEO (board chairman). In 1990, he acquired the painting Funeral of a Mummy on the Nile by American painter Frederick Arthur Bridgman at an auction and donated it to the Speed Art Museum in Louisville, on whose board he was a member.

In the field of academia, Cherry endowed the University of Kentucky College of Law with $100,000 for the H. Wendell Cherry Professor of Law. He also endowed two chairs dedicated to medicine at the School of Medicine, the Wendell Cherry Chair in Clinical Trial Research and The Wendell Cherry Chair in Cancer Translational Research.

== Sources ==
- John E. Kleber: The Encyclopedia of Louisville. University Press of Kentucky, Lexington 200, ISBN 0-8131-2100-0.
- Sotheby's New York (Hrsg.): Property from the Estate of Wendell Cherry. Auctions Catalog Sale 6565, Sotheby's New York, New York 1994.
