= Four Reigns =

Novel by Kukrit Pramoj

- Author: Kukrit Pramoj
- Original title: สี่แผ่นดิน
- Translator: Tulachandra
- Language: Thai
- Publication date: 1953
- Publication place: Thailand
- English publication date: 1981

Four Reigns (Thai: สี่แผ่นดิน, Si Phaendin) is a Thai historical novel by Kukrit Pramoj. First serialized in the Siam Rath newspaper from 1951 to 1952 and published in book form in 1953, the novel follows the life of Phloi (พลอย), a girl from a noble family who is brought to live in the royal court. As she grows up and lives her life through the reigns of kings Rama V to Rama VIII (1868–1946), she witnesses the social and political changes in the country leading to and following the abolishment of absolute monarchy in 1932. It is one of the most influential Thai novels, widely regarded as a classic and described by the Encyclopaedia Britannica as "probably the best-selling Thai novel of all time." Four Reigns offers a nostalgic view on the monarchy and aristocracy, contrasting what it paints as former glory days to the struggles Phloi faces following the political upheaval.

== TV series ==
Si Phaendin used to be made into a television drama five times as follows:

Years	1961	1974	1980	1991	2003 2016 (Rerun) 2023 (Rerun)
Channels	Channel 4	Channel 5	Channel 5	Channel 3	Channel 9 PPTVHD36 (Rerun); Channel 5 (Rerun)
Making companies	Kanokwan Dan-udom		Kanokwan Dan-udom	I Am Production Co., Ltd.	Two Hands Co., Ltd.
Screenplay				Nalinee Seetasuwan; Nirut Seetasuwan	Bhandevanov Devakula
Directors	Supan Buranapim	Supan Buranapim	Kantaree Narkprapha	Suprawat Pattamasoot	Bhandevanov Devakula
Characters	Main cast				
Mae Chaem แม่แช่ม				Pirawan Prasopsart	Saralee Kitiyakorn
Mae Ploy แม่พลอย	Sutanya Sinlapavetin; Supan Buranapim	Patchara Chinpongsanon	Nantaporn Ampalin (youth); Nantawan Mekyai (old age)	Chintara Sukapatana	Siriyakorn Pukkavesh
Phraya Pokonalam / Khun Prem คุณเปรม	Arkhom Makaranon	Prapas Sakuntanak	Pinyo Thongchua	Chatchai Plengpanich	Teerapat Sajakul
An Praphan อั้น ประพันธ์			Witoon Karuna	Sataporn Nakwilairoj	Shahkrit Yamnam
Oad Prapot อ๊อด ประพจน์			Nappon Gomarachun	Ron Banjongsang	Krekpon Mussayawanich
On Praphon อ้น ประพนธ์			Piriyawat Pech-La	Ponrat Rodraksa	Penpetch Benyakul
Neung พี่เนื่อง	Tom Wisawachat		Sak Rodrin	Trin Settachoke	Ninnart Sinchai
Praphai ประไพ			Sukanya Narkson	Trerak Rakkandee	Sujira Arunpipat
Characters	Supporting cast				
Phraya Phiphit พระยาพิพิธ ฯ	Sahas Binlong	Somchai Asanajinda		Sompob Benjathikul	Nirut Sirijanya
Mae Choi แม่ช้อย	Choosri Meesommon	Sumalee Chanpoomdon	Padungsri Sopita	Pen Pisut	Sakaewan Yongjaiyudh
Kun Choei คุณเชย	Praphapan Narkthong		Naiyana Kachasaeng	Thitima Sangkhaphithak	Chalida Thaochalee
Kun Un คุณอุ่น	Sarinthip Siriwan	Rajit Pinyowanich	Uthumporn Silaphan	Thanya Sophon	Chudapa Chantakett
Por Perm พ่อเพิ่ม	Somkuan Krajangsas		Setha Sirachaya	Arnon Suwankrau	Puttipong Promsaka Na Sakolnakorn
Kun Sai คุณสาย	Manas Bunyakiat		Manas Bunyakiat	Ponglada Pimolwan	Daraneenute Pasutanavin
Princess เสด็จพระองค์หญิงฯ	Jutharat Jindarat		Somjit Supsamruay	Nantawan Mekyai	Thanya Sophon
Luang O Soth หลวงโอสถ			Wicha Wachara	Sommart Praihirun	Sakrat Ruekthamrong
Grandma Pit ยายพิศ	Sulaleewan Suwanatat		Napaporn Hongsakul	Nuttanee Sittisamarn	Mayuree Isarangkoon Na Ayutthaya
Sombun สมบุญ				Prissana Klampinij	Benjasiri Wattana
Somjai สมใจ					Jirapat Wongpaisanluk
Waw แวว				Jirawadee Isarangkun Na Ayutthaya	Nahatai Lekbumrung
Luang Nop หลวงนพ	Wong Srisawas		Amnuay Sirijan	Suchao Pongwilai	Krn Phothipiti
Mae Chan แม่ชั้น	Malee Wechpraset			Tassawan Seneewongse	Pannatat Phothiwechkul
Plang ปลั่ง					Hathaikarn Theppanya
Kun Chid (Young Man) คุณชิด (วัยหนุ่ม)					Nattapol Kongsin
Kun Chid (Young) คุณชิด (วัยเด็ก)					Anthony Daniel Hiws
Kriek เกริก					Chokanan Sakultham
Nit นิตถ์					Phoobet Bunkrongthong
Kun Chid คุณชิด			Chusak Suteeram	Kasama Nitsaiphan	
Phad ผาด				Orn-urai Tianngeing	
Grandma Thiab ยายเทียบ				Manas Bunyakiat	
แม่ของสมบุญ				Kesinee Wongpakdee	
เยื้อน				Araya Srisoikaew	
เมียอั้นคนไทย				Khunkanich Koomkrong	
Puang พวง				Pattysia Lamnwaimans	
นางข้าหลวง 1				Ler-rin Jitpech	
นางข้าหลวง 2				Apiradee Saingam	
Characters	Cameo				
Por Chim พ่อฉิม					Sataporn Nakwilairoj
Than Chai Noi ท่านชายน้อย				Pennueng Chaichit	Krish Hiranprueck
Sewi เสวี			Wut Kongkhakhet	Santi Santiwetchakun	Voravudh Niyomsap
Loosin ลูซิลล์			Hatairat Amatavanich	Pamela Bowden	Sunissa Brown
Khun Ying Pipit / Khun Ying Ouam คุณหญิงเอื้อม					Pattai Chaidi Dididi
Jam Klon จำโขลน					Suttijit Veeradechkamhang
Kun Nui คุณนุ้ย	Srinuan Kaewbuasai		Juree Ohsiri	Rattanaporn Inthornkamhaeng	Natha Lloyd
Kun Nian คุณเนียน				Chalao Prasopsart	Arunporn Jareinyong
Mae Ploy (Young) แม่พลอย (วัยเด็ก)	Kanlaya Buranapim		Pilaiporn Wetpraset	Chumpicha Chaisorakorn	Kornpapha Peungphan
An Praphan (Young) อั้น ประพันธ์ (วัยเด็ก)				Montree Ne-thirak	Krin Phothipiti
Oad Prapot (Young) อ๊อด ประพันธ์ (วัยเด็ก)				Peerapan Sukprayoon	Akkanat Timnate
On Praphon (Young) อ้น ประพนธ์ (วัยเด็ก)				Chanisorn Ampairatanapon	Chawit Amnuayruangsri
Neung (Young) พี่เนื่อง (วัยเด็ก)	Phiphop			Apichart Rattanathaworn	Pichayadon Peungphan
Praphai (Young) ประไพ (วัยเด็ก)				Woraporn Jittasenee	Michelle Behrmann
Phraya Phiphit (Young Man) พระยาพิพิธ ฯ (วัยหนุ่ม)					Trin Settachoke
Mae Choi (Young) แม่ช้อย (วัยเด็ก)	Chantana Sarikabut		Apple Jindanuch	Kanyalak Bamrungrak	Krittiya Wuddhihiranpreeda
Choei (Young) คุณเชย (วัยเด็ก)			Nong Isarangkun Na Ayutthaya	Panisa Wichupong	Rujisaya Thinrat
Kun Un (Young) คุณอุ่น (วัยเด็ก)					Manisa Bungkasikorn
Por Perm (Young) หลวงภัณฑ์วิจารณ์ (พ่อเพิ่ม) (วัยเด็ก)	Samart Bunglong	Somkid Hongsakul		Kittithep Bunyakiat	Ravisut Mantaseree

== Original soundtracks ==
=== 1991 ===
No.	Title	Lyrics	Music	Artist(s)	Length
1.	"See Pan Din" (Thai: สี่แผ่นดิน)	Wirach U-Thaworn	Wirach U-Thaworn	Prim Preechasatit	3:43
Total length:					00:00

=== 2003 ===
No.	Title	Lyrics	Music	Artist(s)	Length
1.	"Lao Kum Hom" (Thai: ลาวคำหอม)	Pen Payongying	Prayaprasanduriyasup (Plak Prasansup)	Duangporn Pongphasuk	5:51
Total length:					00:00
