= Baby mama (disambiguation) =

Baby mama is a slang term for an unmarried mother.

Baby mama may also refer to:

- Baby Mama (film), a 2008 American comedy
- "Baby Mama" (Brandy song), 2020
- "Baby Mama" (Fantasia song), 2005
- "Baby Mama", a song by Three 6 Mafia from Choices: The Album, 2001

== See also ==
- Baby Daddy (disambiguation)
