= Mutha =

Mutha can refer to:

== Places ==
- Mutha River, a river in western India
- Mutha, Banmauk, a village in north-central Burma

== Other uses ==
- Mother
- Short for Motherfucker
- "Mutha (Don't Wanna Go to School Today)", song by Extreme from the album Extreme (1989)

== See also ==
- Mula-Mutha River, formed by confluence of the Mula and Mutha Rivers
