= Mother (disambiguation) =

A mother is a female parent.

Mother may also refer to:

== Literature ==
- "Mother" (short story), a 1907 short story by Owen Wister
- Mother (novel), 1906 novel by Maxim Gorky
- "A Mother", a 1914 short story by James Joyce

== Theatre ==
- Mother (opera), a 1929 opera by the Czech composer Alois Hába
- Mother, a 1938 opera by Valery Zhelobinsky
- Mother, opera by Tikhon Khrennikov
- Mother (play), a 1910 play by Jules Eckert Goodman

== Film ==
=== United States ===
- Mother (1910 film), an American silent film by the Thanhouser Company
- Mother (1914 film), an American silent film by Maurice Tourneur
- Mother, a 1927 American silent film written by Charles Kerr
- Mother (1996 film), an American film by Albert Brooks
- Mother, a 2006 short film by Sian Heder
- mother!, a 2017 American film by Darren Aronofsky
- Mother, a computer in Alien (1979)

=== Europe ===
- Mother (1926 film), a Russian film by Vsevolod Pudovkin
- Mother (1937 film), a Hungarian film by Johann von Vásáry
- Mother (1955 film), a Soviet film by Mark Donskoy
- Mother (1990 film), a Soviet film by Gleb Panfilov
- Mother (1999 Russian film), a feature film by Denis Yevstigneyev
- Mother (2016 Georgian film), a short film directed by Rati Tsiteladze
- Mother (2016 Estonian film), a drama film by Kadri Kõusaar
- Mother (2017 Spanish film), a short film by Rodrigo Sorogoyen
- Mother (2019 Spanish film), a film by Rodrigo Sorogoyen based on his short film of the same name
- Mother (2025 film), a film by Teona Strugar Mitevska

=== Asia ===
- Mother, a 1935 Chinese film by Wen Yimin
- Mother, a 1949 Chinese film by Shi Hui (director)
- Mother (1951 film), an Iranian film by Esmail Koushan
- Mother (1952 film), a Japanese film by Mikio Naruse
- Mother, a 1956 Chinese film by Ling Zifeng
- Mother (1963 film), a Japanese film by Kaneto Shindo
- Mother (1985 film), a Korean film by Park Chul-soo
- Ibunda, a 1986 Indonesian film by Teguh Karya, released internationally as Mother
- Mother (1991 film), an Iranian film by Ali Hatami
- Mother (1999 film), an Indian film starring Rekha
- Mother (2009 film), a South Korean film by Bong Joon-ho
- Mother (2010 film), a Chinese film by Cai Ning
- Mother (2014 film), a Japanese film by Kazuo Umezu
- Mother (2020 film), a Japanese film by Tatsushi Ōmori

== Television ==
=== Series ===
- Mother (Japanese TV series), a 2010 Japanese television drama
- Mother (Turkish TV series), a 2016 Turkish television drama
- Mother (South Korean TV series), 2018

=== Episodes ===
- "Mother" (Once Upon a Time), a 2015 episode from the TV series Once Upon a Time
- "Mother" (The Flash), an episode from the TV series The Flash
- "Mother", an episode from the sixth season of Fear the Walking Dead
- "Mother...", an episode of Fullmetal Alchemist

=== Characters ===
- Mother (The Avengers), a 1960s British TV character

== Games ==
- Mother (video game series), a role-playing video game series
  - Mother (video game), a 1989 role-playing video game

== Music ==
=== Bands ===
- Mother Mother, a Canadian rock band formerly called Mother

=== Albums ===
- Mother (Cold Beat album), 2020
- Mother (In This Moment album), 2020
- Mother (Kubb album), 2005
- Mother (Luna Sea album), 1994
- Mother (Natalie Maines album), 2013
- Mother (Mother Mother album), 2005
- Mother (Cleo Sol album), 2021
- Mother (Keiichi Suzuki and Hirokazu Tanaka album), 1989
- Mother (Jacky Terrasson and Stéphane Belmondo album), 2016
- Mother (Veil of Maya album), 2023
- Mother (Susumu Yokota album), 2009
- Mother, an album by Gilli Smyth
- Mother EP, a 2024 EP by Mother Mother
- Mother (ZZ Ward EP), 2024

=== Songs ===
- "Mother" (Axel Hirsoux song), 2014
- "Mother" (Blondie song), 2011
- "Mother" (Charlie Puth song), 2019
- "Mother" (Danzig song), 1988
- "Mother" (John Lennon song), 1970
- "Mother" (Luna Sea song), 1995
- "Mother" (Meghan Trainor song), 2023
- "Mother" (Pink Floyd song), 1979
- "Mother", by the Afro Celt Sound System from Volume 5: Anatomic
- "Mother", by Ashanti from The Declaration
- "Mother", by Chicago from Chicago III
- "Mother", by Era from Era
- "Mother", by Goldie from Saturnz Return
- "Mother", by Cyndi Lauper from Sisters of Avalon
- "Mother", by Florence + the Machine from How Big, How Blue, How Beautiful
- "Mother", by James from Seven
- "Mother", by M-Factor
- "Mother", by Moloko from Things to Make and Do
- "Mother", by The Police from Synchronicity
- "Mother", by Puffy AmiYumi from Mother/Nehorina hahorina
- "Mother", by Ray Charles released as single in 2002
- "Mother", by Red House Painters from Red House Painters
- "Mother", by Tori Amos from Little Earthquakes
- "Mother", from the musical A Chorus Line
- "Mother", by Kacey Musgraves from Golden Hour
- "MOTHER", by Susumu Hirasawa from Technique of Relief
- "M-O-T-H-E-R", by Howard Johnson
- "Mother", by Blonde Redhead from Melody of Certain Damaged Lemons
- "Mother", by Porter Robinson from Nurture
- "Mother", by Tyler, The Creator from Chromakopia

== Food and drink ==
- Mother (drink)
- Mother's, a kosher food brand owned by The Manischewitz Company
- Fermentation starter, sometimes called a "mother", used to start the fermentation process in making various foods and drinks
  - Kombucha mother, or SCOBY (for symbiotic colony of bacteria and yeast), occurring in the making of kombucha
  - "Mother" or "mother dough", a pre-ferment starter dough
  - Mother of vinegar

== Other uses ==
- Mother (advertising agency), a global advertising agency founded in the UK
- Motherboard, the main printed circuit board found in microcomputers
- Mother, prototype of the British Mark I tank
- (Sometimes spelled "moth-er"), a person who studies moths
- Mother superiors, addressed as Mother [religious name]
- Studio Mother, a Japanese animation studio

== See also ==
- The dictionary definition of moth-er at Wiktionary
- Ma (disambiguation)
- Mama (disambiguation)
- Mom (disambiguation)
- Mommy (disambiguation)
- Mothers (disambiguation)
- Mum (disambiguation)
- Mummy (disambiguation)
- Mutha (disambiguation)
- The Mother (disambiguation)
- Queen-mother (disambiguation)
- Mother 3, a 2006 role-playing video game
