= Mamma Mia =

Mamma mia (pronounced [ˈmamma ˈmiːa]; an Italian interjection, literally "mommy mine"), Mammamia, Mamamia or Mumma Mia may refer to:

== Music ==
=== Works associated with ABBA ===
- "Mamma Mia" (ABBA song), 1975
- Mamma Mia! (musical), a stage play based on ABBA songs, which premiered in London in 1999
  - Mamma Mia! Original Cast Recording, soundtrack to the stage show
- Mamma Mia! (film), 2008, based on the musical
  - Mamma Mia! The Movie Soundtrack, soundtrack to the above film
- Mamma Mia! Here We Go Again, 2018 film sequel
  - Mamma Mia! Here We Go Again: The Movie Soundtrack, soundtrack to the above film

=== Other artists ===
- ¡Mamma Mia!, a 1988 album by Mexican pop singer Verónica Castro
- "Mamma Mia" (Darin song), 2014
- "Mama mia" (In-Grid song), 2005
- "Mamma Mia" (Kara song), 2014
- Mamma Mia! (SF9 EP), 2018
- "Mamma Mia (He's Italiano)", 2014 song by Elena Gheorghe
- "Mama Mia", a song by Lil Wayne from the album Funeral
- "Mammamia" (Måneskin song), 2021

== Film and television ==
- "Mamma Mia" (30 Rock), a third-season episode of the NBC television series 30 Rock
- "Mamma Mia" (Frasier), a seventh-season episode of the American television series Frasier
- "Mamma Mia" (Supernatural), a twelfth-season episode of the American television series Supernatural
- Mammamia!, an Italian television program
- Mamma Mia (1995 film), a Ghanaian film
- Mamma Mia! (film) a 2008 film, and its 2018 sequel, Mamma Mia! Here We Go Again
- Mamma Mia! I Have a Dream British reality talent competition

== Other ==
- Mamamia (website), an Australian opinion and lifestyle website targeted at women
- Mammamia, a genus of Italian cave-dwelling millipedes
- Mama Mia Trattoria, an Italian restaurant in Portland, Oregon
- "Mamma mia", a catchphrase said by titular character Mario from the Mario franchise
