= La Mama =

La Mama may refer to:

- La Mama (band), a German disco group
- La MaMa Experimental Theatre Club in East Village, Manhattan, New York City, founded 1961
- La Mama Theatre (Melbourne) in Carlton, Victoria, Australia, founded 1967
