= Mommy (tortoise) =

- Species: Western Santa Cruz tortoise (Chelonoidis porteri)
- Sex: Female
- Born: c. 1927
- Mate: Abrazzo
- Weight: 284 lb (129 kg)

Mommy is a Western Santa Cruz tortoise housed at the Philadelphia Zoo, who set the world record for giving birth at the age of 97. She first arrived at the zoo in 1932. Before successfully hatching eggs in 2025, she had previously laid three groups of eggs in 2023. However, none of them hatched.

== Early life ==
Mommy hatched in the wild on the Galápagos Islands. On April 23rd, 1932, she was brought to the Philadelphia Zoo by a Philadelphia man named Milton W. Holden, and has resided there since.

== Breeding ==
In 2020, the zoo began their attempt to pair her with a mate as a part of their breeding program.
