= Method of moments =

Method of moments may refer to:

- Method of moments (electromagnetics), a numerical method in electromagnetics, also referred to as boundary element method in other fields
- Method of moments (statistics), a method of parameter estimation in statistics
- Generalized method of moments, a generic method of parameter estimation of statistical models
- Method of moments (probability theory), a way of proving convergence in distribution in probability theory
- Second moment method, a technique used in probability theory to show that a random variable is positive with positive probability
