= Mom (short story) =

"Mom" (Thai: มอม, pronounced [mɔ̄m]) is a Thai short story written by Kukrit Pramoj. It tells the story of Mom, a pet dog who is separated from its owners during the bombing of Bangkok in World War II. First published in book form as part of the anthology Ruam Rueang San Kukrit (A Collection of Kukrit's Short Stories) in 1952, it has since been included in the Ministry of Education's standard Thai-language secondary school textbook and adapted into two television series and a stage musical. "Mom" is included in the List of 100 Good Books for the Development of Children and Youth by the Quality Learning Foundation, a public agency under the Office of the Prime Minister.
