= Frederick Arthur Bridgman =

American painter (1847–1928)

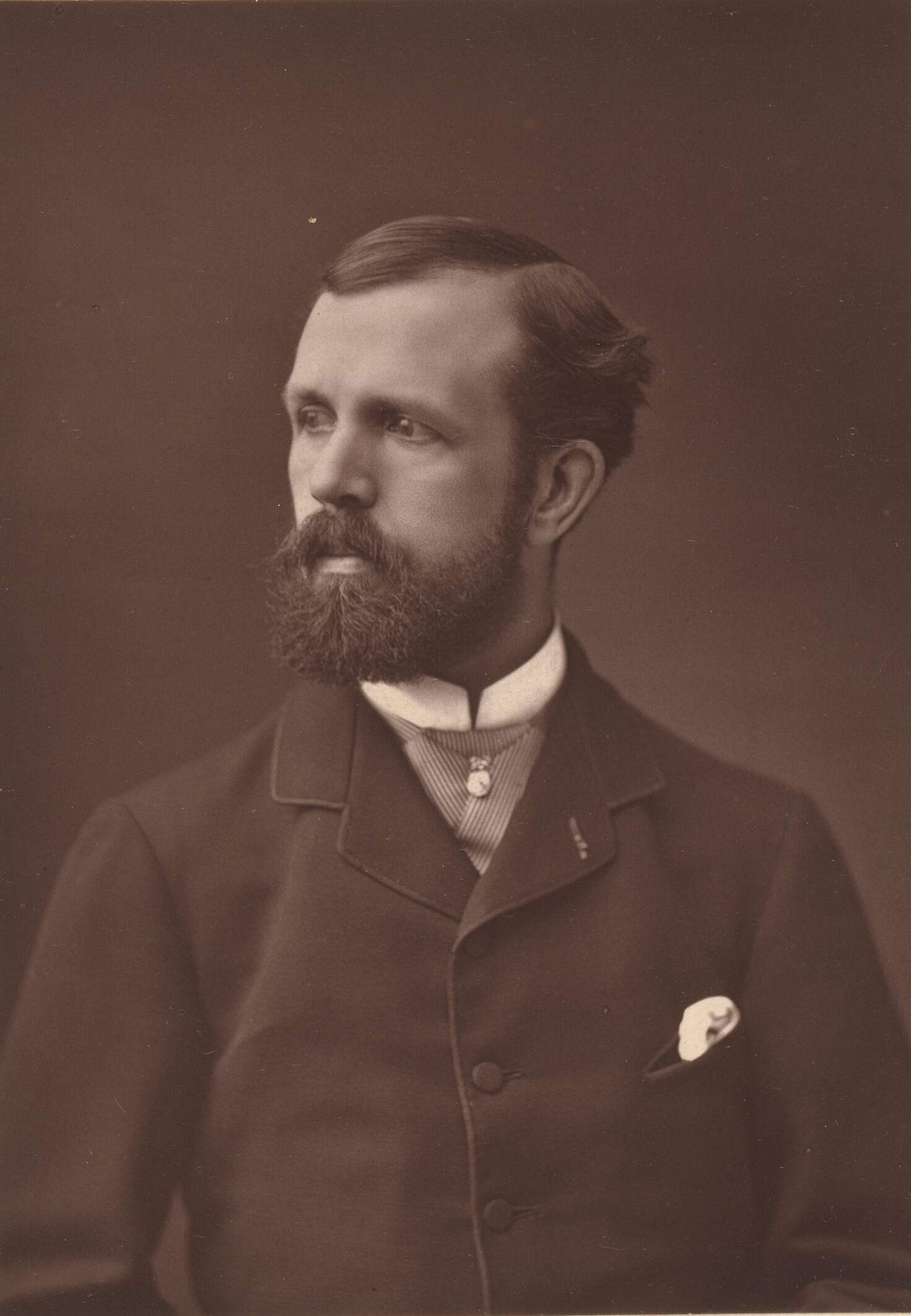
- Portrait, c. 1877
- Born: 10 November 1847; Tuskegee, Alabama, US
- Died: 13 January 1928 (aged 80); Rouen, France
- Education: Brooklyn Art Association; National Academy of Design; Jean-Léon Gérôme
- Movement: Orientalist

Frederick Arthur Bridgman (November 10, 1847 – January 13, 1928) was an American artist known for his paintings of "Orientalist" subjects.

== Life and career ==
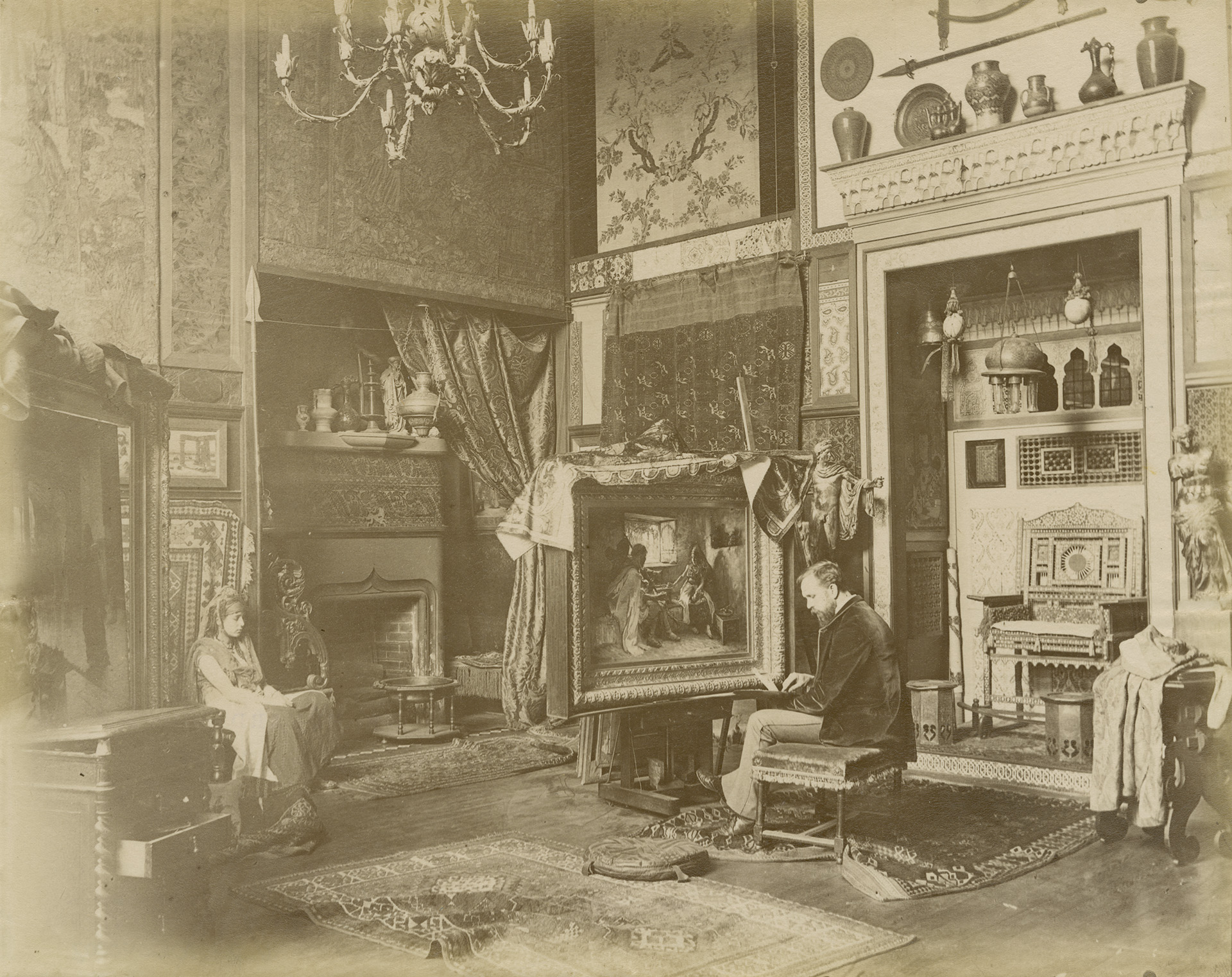
Frederic Arthur Bridgman in his Paris studio, c. 1885, albumen print by Edmond Bénard, Department of Image Collections, National Gallery of Art Library, Washington, DC

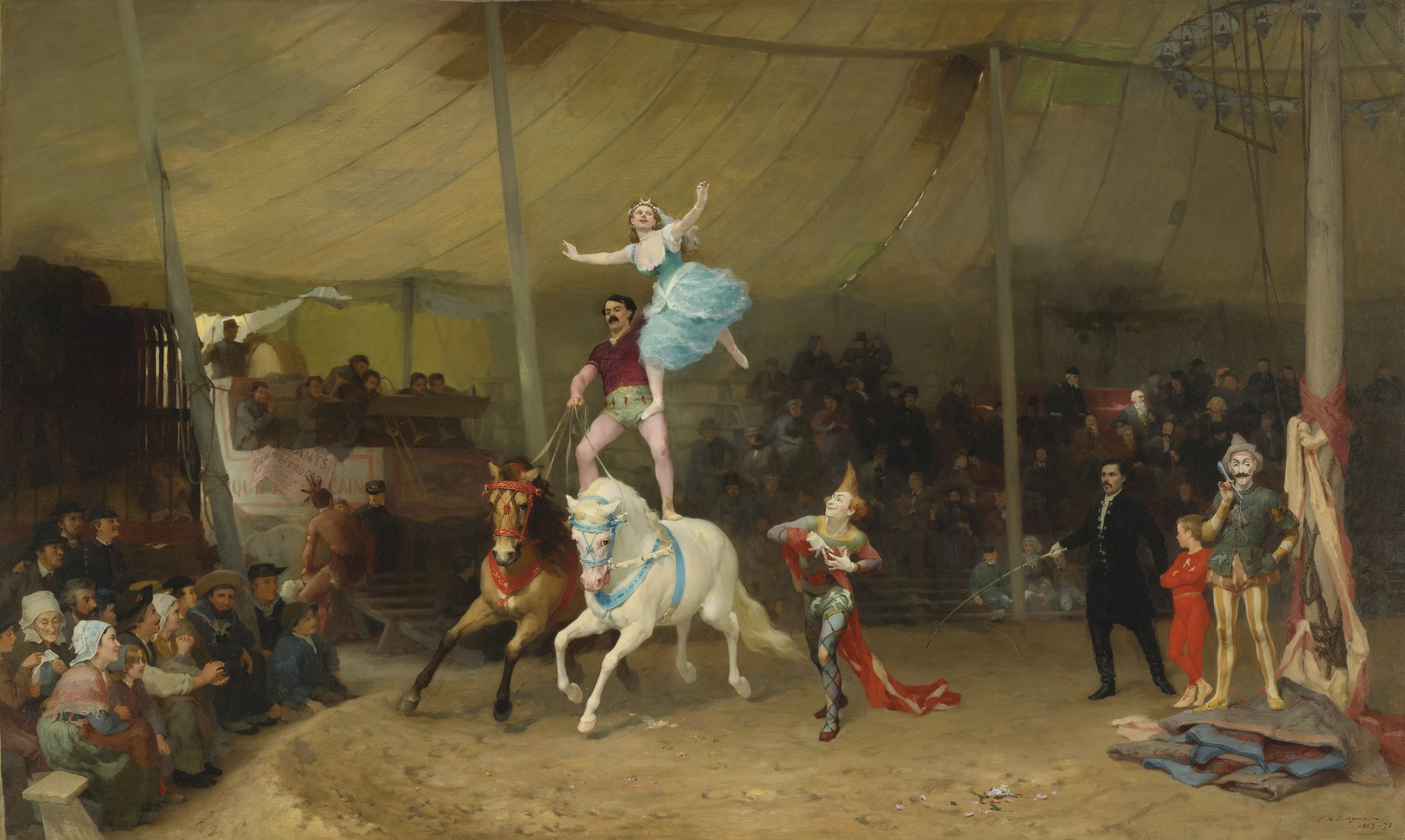
A Provincial Circus (1870)

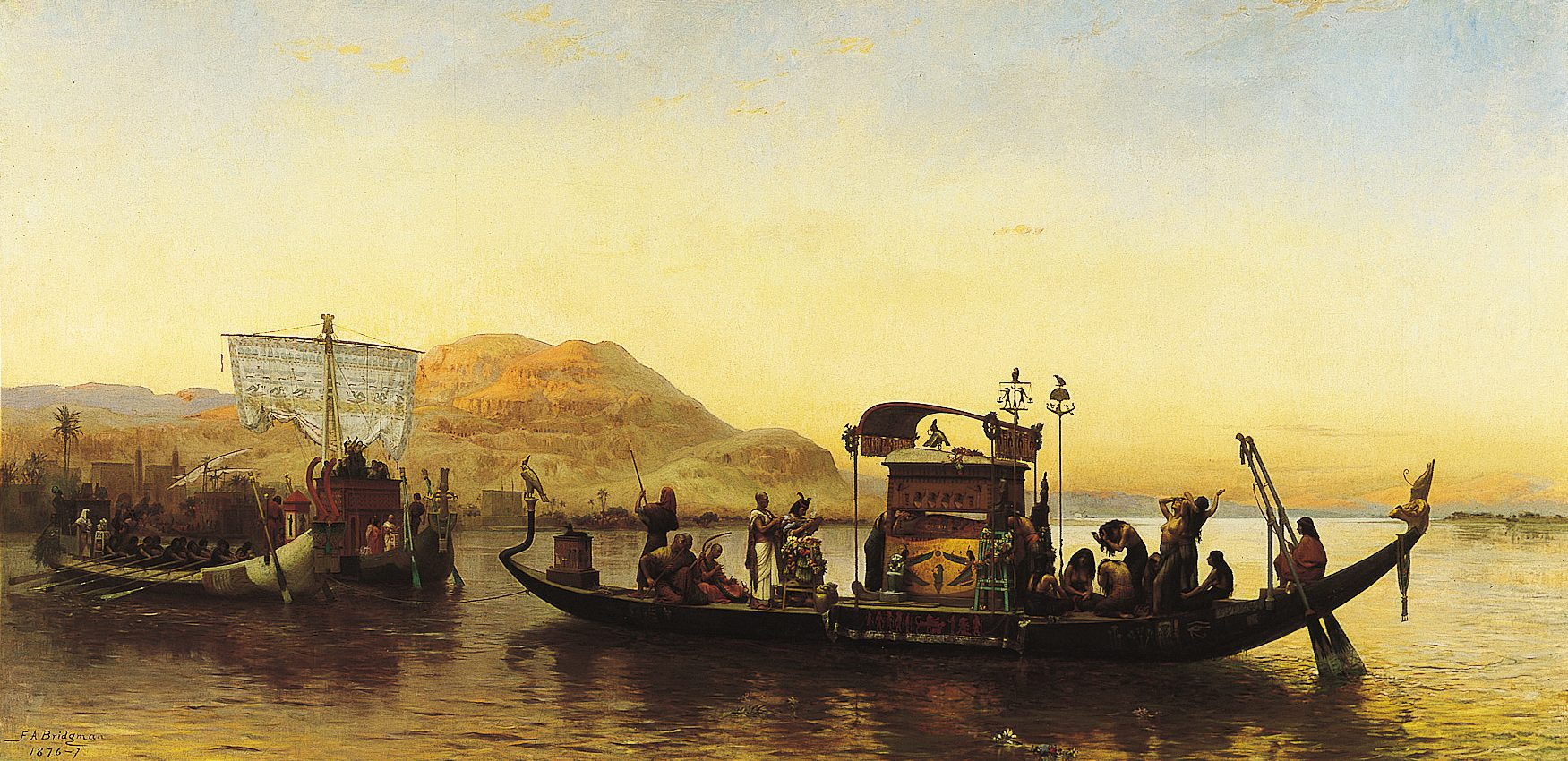
Funeral of a Mummy on the Nile (1876–77)

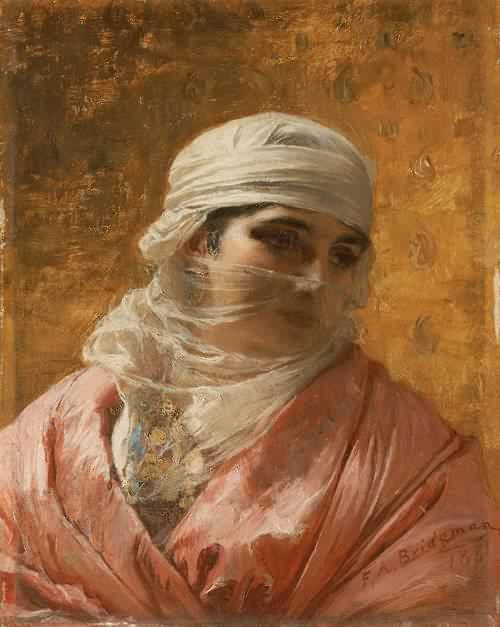
A Circassian (1881)

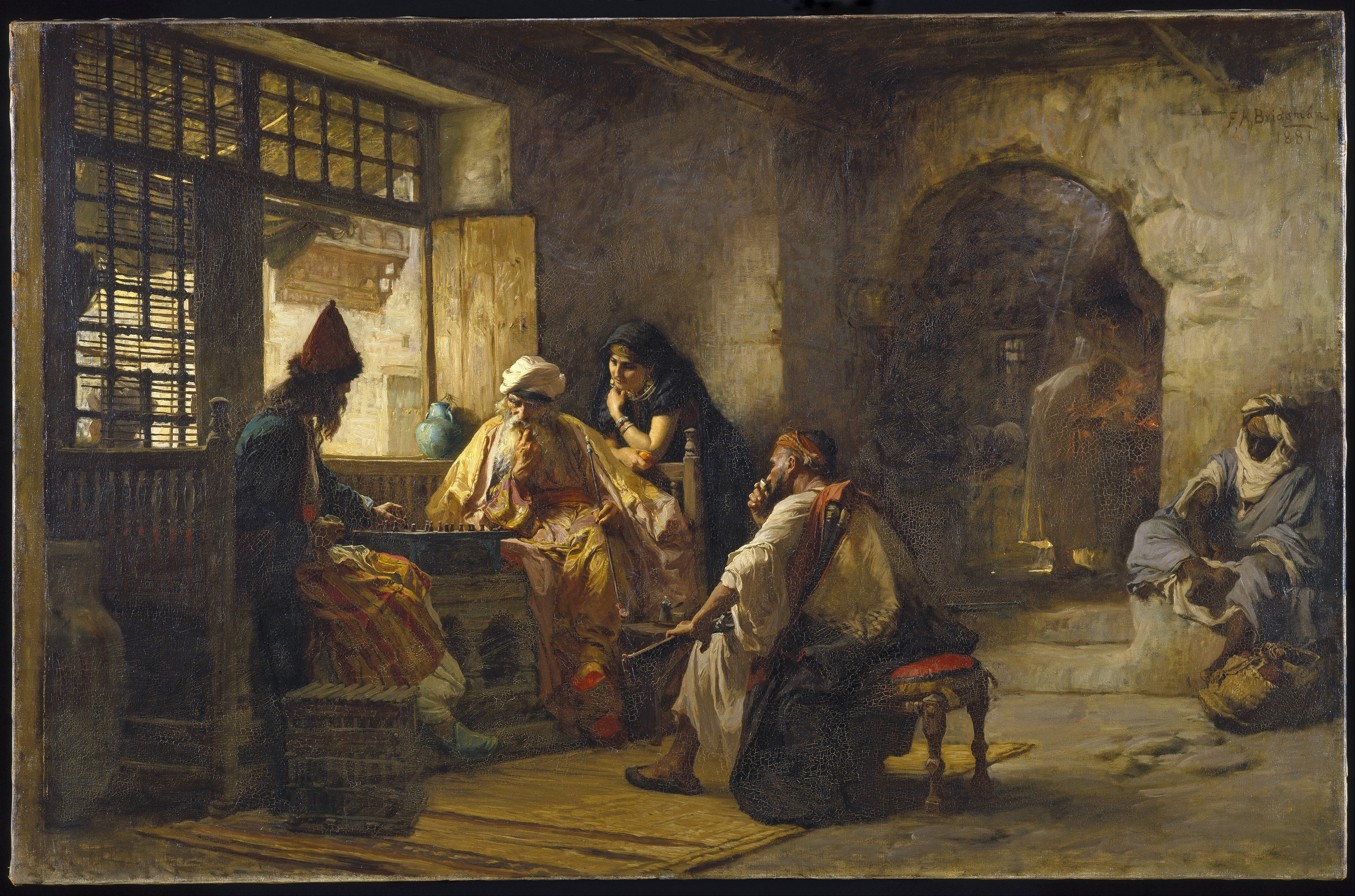
An Interesting Game (c. 1881)

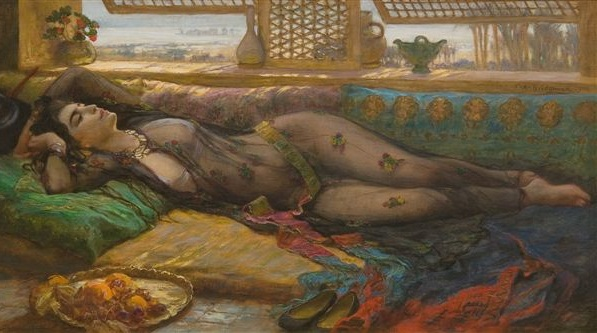
Reclining beauty, one of Bridgman's odalisque paintings

Born in Tuskegee, Alabama, Bridgman was the son of a physician. After his father died in 1850, his mother moved to New York City with her two sons. Bridgman began working as a draughtsman for the American Bank Note Company in 1864–65, and studied art in the same years at the Brooklyn Art Association and at the National Academy of Design. He exhibited his paintings at the Brooklyn Art Association, and encouraged by his success, he gave up his job in 1866 and moved to France with the sponsorship of a group of Brooklyn businessmen.

Bridgman's first destination in France was Pont-Aven in the Brittany region, where he stayed with a group of American artists, among them Robert Wylie. In the autumn of 1866, he went to Paris and entered the studio of the noted academic painter Jean-Léon Gérôme (1824–1904), where he was deeply influenced by Gérôme's precise draftsmanship, smooth finishes, and concern for Middle-Eastern themes. While studying in the atelier of Gérôme, he became acquainted with his fellow students Harry Humphrey Moore and Thomas Eakins and also first came in contact with Orientalism. He remained there for four years, spending his summers at Pont-Aven with Wylie. Bridgman's first exhibition in Paris took place at the Salon de Paris in 1870, and his painting A Provincial Circus (fr. Un cirque en province) was received very positively. It was then sent to New York and exhibited at the Brooklyn Art Association.

Because of the outbreak of the Franco-Prussian War, Bridgman was forced to leave Paris in the early 1870s. After spending time in Britain and Spain, he made his first trips to North Africa between 1872 and 1874, dividing his time between Morocco, Tunisia, Algeria and Egypt. On his trip to Egypt, he was accompanied by fellow artist Charles Sprague Pearce. Arriving in Cairo in December 1873, they worked in the city producing numerous sketches of the Islamic monuments, but also the street life, which was Bridgman's main inspiration. They travelled along the Nile, reaching Abu Simbel in the south of Egypt. During his trips, Bridgman executed approximately three hundred sketches, which became the source material for several later oil paintings that attracted immediate attention. Bridgman became known as "the American Gérôme", although Bridgman would later adopt a more naturalistic aesthetic, emphasizing bright colors and painterly brushwork.

His large and important composition, Funeral of a Mummy on the Nile (1876–77; Speed Art Museum, Louisville), exhibited at the Salon de Paris in 1877 and at the 1878 Paris Exposition, bought by James Gordon Bennett, Jr., established his success as an artist and brought him the Cross of the Legion of Honor. The painting was later purchased by the famous American collector Wendell Cherry who donated it to the Speed Art Museum in Louisville, Kentucky in 1990.

In 1881, Bridgman exhibited over 300 of his works in a personal exhibition in New York. His work was highly praised for the variety of subjects and the fine quality of execution. Following this success, Bridgman was elected a member of the National Academy of Design, after already being an associate member since 1874.

In 1877, Bridgman married Florence Mott Baker from Boston in Paris. He returned to North Africa in the winter of 1885–86, settling in Algiers with his wife. In 1889, he published the book Winters in Algeria, with memories and numerous woodcut illustrations from his travels to North Africa. His repeated visits to the region throughout the 1870s and 1880s allowed him to amass a collection of costumes, architectural pieces, and objets d'art, which often appear in his paintings. John Singer Sargent noted that Bridgman's overstuffed studio, along with the Eiffel Tower, were Paris's must-see attractions.

One of the greatest successes of his artistic career was his participation in the 1889 Paris Exposition, where five of his paintings were exhibited. Though Bridgman maintained a lifelong connection to France, his popularity in the US never waned. In 1890, the artist had a personal exhibition of over 400 pictures in New York's 5th Avenue galleries. When the show moved to Chicago's Art Institute, it contained only 300 works – testimony to the high number of sales Bridgman had made.

In 1901, his wife died of a neurological illness. In 1904, he married Marthe Yaeger. After the First World War, he left Paris and retired to Lyons-la-Forêt (Normandy) with his wife. He died in Rouen in 1928 at the age of 80.

== See also ==
- List of Orientalist artists
- Orientalism

== Sources ==
- Additional information gathered and paraphrased from non-copyrighted auction information published by Sotheby's Auction House.
