= Mama Municipality, Yucatán =

Municipality in the Mexican state of Yucatán

Mama
- Municipality
- Region 7 Sur #046

- Location of the Municipality in Mexico
- Coordinates: 20°28′38″N 89°21′54″W
- Country: Mexico
- State: Yucatán
- Mexico Ind.: 1821
- Yucatán Est.: 1824

Government
  - Type: 2012–2015
  - Municipal President: Maximiliano Dzib Xiu

Area
  - Total: 117.52 km^{2} (45.37 sq mi)
- Elevation: 24 m (79 ft)

Population (2010)
  - Total: 2,888
  - Density: 24.57/km^{2} (63.65/sq mi)
  - Demonym: Umanense
- Time zone: UTC-6 (Central Standard Time)
- INEGI Code: 046
- Major Airport: Merida (Manuel Crescencio Rejón) International Airport
- IATA Code: MID
- ICAO Code: MMMD

Mama Municipality (In the Yucatec Maya Language: “maternal water") is a municipality in the Mexican state of Yucatán containing 117.52 km^{2} of land and is located roughly 55 km southeast of the city of Mérida.

== History ==
There is no accurate data on when the town was founded, though it existed before the conquest as part of the chiefdom of Tutulxiu. At colonization, Mama became part of the encomienda system with the encomendero of Juan Aguilar, in 1580.

Yucatán declared its independence from the Spanish Crown in 1821, and in 1825 the area was assigned to the low sierra partition and designated as its own municipality.

== Governance ==
The municipal president is elected for a three-year term. The town council has four councilpersons, who serve as Secretary and councilors of public works; education, culture and sports; public sanitation and potable water; and public lighting.

The Municipal Council administers the business of the municipality. It is responsible for budgeting and expenditures and producing all required reports for all branches of the municipal administration. Annually it determines educational standards for schools.

The Police Commissioners ensure public order and safety. They are tasked with enforcing regulations, distributing materials and administering rulings of general compliance issued by the council.

== Communities ==
The head of the municipality is Mama, Yucatán. The populated areas of the municipality include: Chaltubalam, Limonar, Moam, Pisté, Saca, Sacalum, Sacalumchen, San Agustín, San Andrés, San Bernardino, San Francisco, San Juan, San Mateo Dos, San Salvador, Santa Catalina, Santa Cruz, Santa María, Simkilá, Tikinmul, Took and Xtecab. The significant populations are shown below:

Community	Population
Entire Municipality (2010)	2,888
Mama	2687 in 2005

== Local festivals ==
Every year from 4 to 15 August a festival in honor of the Virgin of the Assumption is held.

== Tourist attractions ==
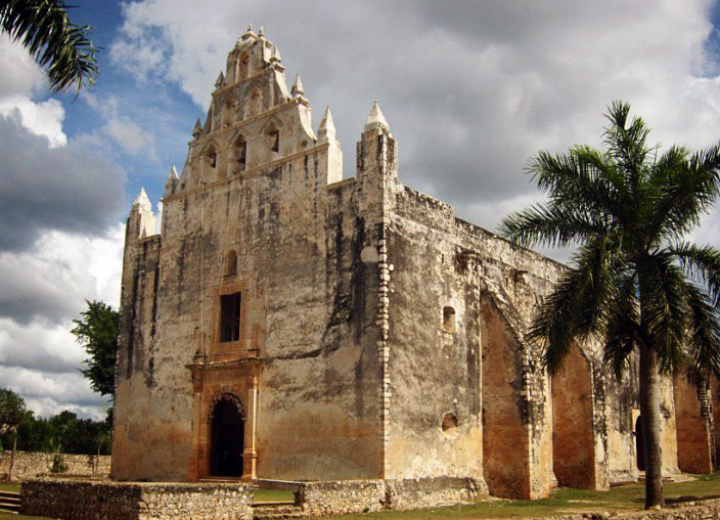
Church of the Assumption

- Church of the Assumption
