= Funeral of a Mummy on the Nile =

1876–1877 painting by Frederick Arthur Bridgman

- Les Funérailles d'une momie (French)
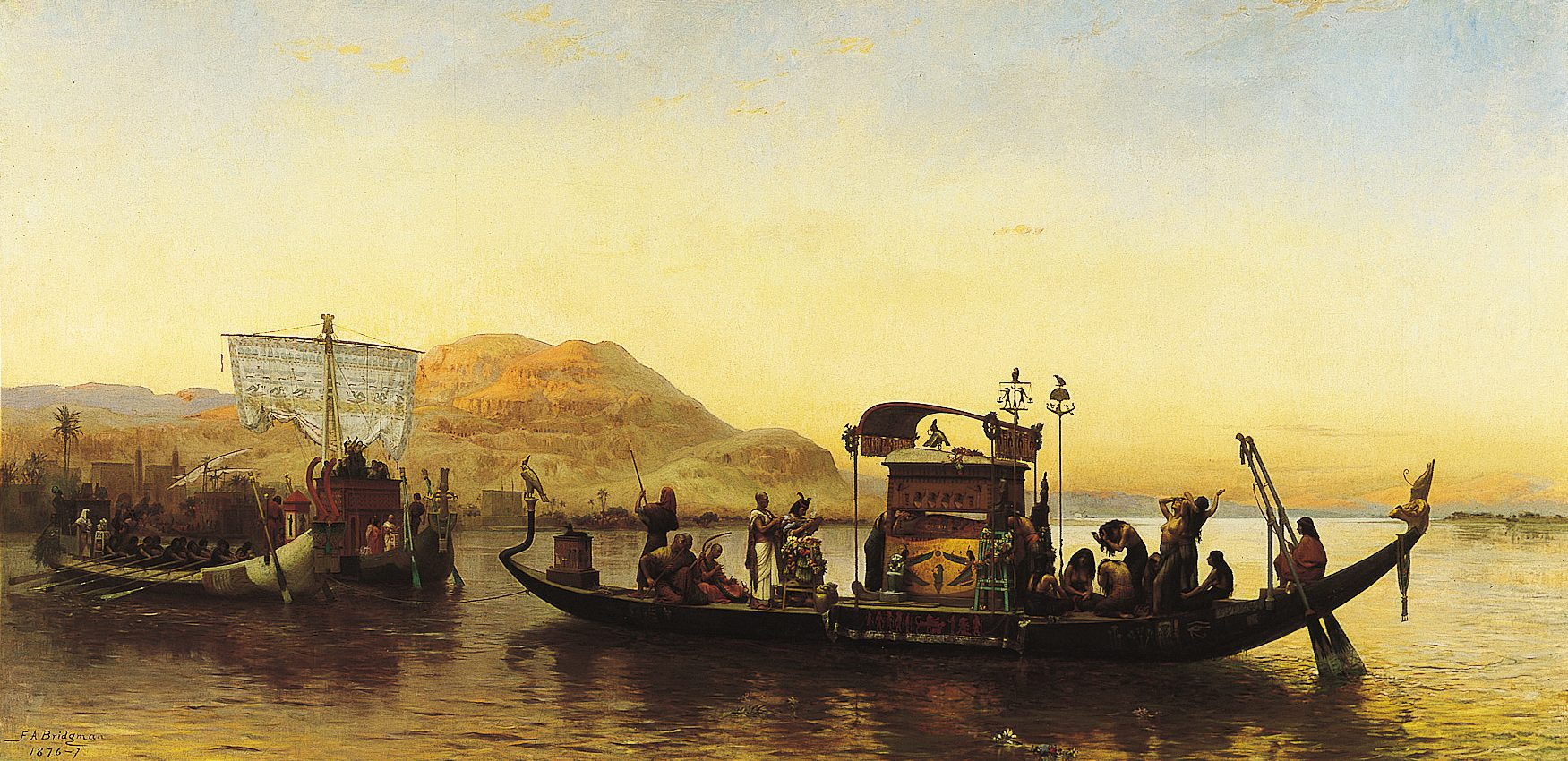
- Artist: Frederick Arthur Bridgman
- Year: 1876–1877
- Medium: Oil on canvas
- Dimensions: 114.3 cm × 232.1 cm (45.0 in × 91.4 in)
- Location: Speed Art Museum; Louisville, Kentucky

Funeral of a Mummy on the Nile (also known as Funeral of a Mummy, French: Les Funérailles d'une momie) is an oil on canvas painting by American artist Frederick Arthur Bridgman. It was painted between 1876 and 1877 and is considered his most acclaimed painting. Since 1990, it has been exhibited in Louisville, Kentucky, at the Speed Art Museum.

== Background ==
Bridgman, who lived in Paris since 1866, made several trips to North Africa between 1872 and 1874. In the winter of 1873–74, he traveled to Egypt for the first time, accompanied by fellow artist Charles Sprague Pearce. After spending some time in Cairo, they traveled upstream along the Nile, reaching as far as Abu Simbel in the south of Egypt. During this trip, Bridgman produced approximately 300 sketches and ink drawings, which became the source material for several later oil paintings. After returning to Paris in the summer of 1874, he commenced numerous large Egypt-themed compositions, among them several ambitious reconstructions of antique Egyptian life.

Bridgman started working on Funeral of a Mummy on the Nile in 1876; the painting took him over six months to complete.

== Description ==
Funeral of a Mummy on the Nile depicts a historical reconstruction of an ancient Egyptian funerary procession. The ancient Egyptians used funerary boats made of wood to transport mummified corpses across the Nile to the western bank, where most burials took place.

The painting portrays three boats moving across the Nile toward its west bank at sunset, with the rear boat, the funerary barge, carrying the royal sarcophagus under a canopy. Near the stern of the barge, a group of female professional mourners are depicted, while two priests are standing on the other side of the sarcophagus, in front of an altar. Behind them, three seated musicians are playing a flute, a lute and a harp. Two other boats precede the funerary barge: a white boat with rowers, carrying the grave goods, is connected to the main barge by a rope and tows it across the Nile. Behind it is the third barge, with a decorated sail, carrying the family of the deceased and the members of the funeral procession. Dotting the water's surface alongside the funeral barge are colorful flowers which have been tossed into the river by the mourners. The background of the painting is formed by a low-ranging view of the river shoreline and the sky, with the yellow and orange colors of a sunset dominating the scene. The painting was signed with "FA Bridgman 1876–7" in the lower left corner.

=== Archaeological details ===
Funeral of a Mummy on the Nile is particularly notable for its historical accuracy. It features many archaeological details and ornaments associated with old Egyptian burial practices, which show Bridgman's passion for the culture of ancient Egypt and his in-depth studies of the ancient traditions. He utilized many available archaeological sources to create an accurate portrayal of life in ancient Egypt. Bridgman also had personal contact with the noted Egyptologist Gaston Maspero, who may have provided him with details about the funeral rites.

- On the rear of the main barge, several symbols associated with Egyptian funerary rites were painted, among them the Eye of Horus.
- On the decorative shrine below the sarcophagus, the goddess Isis and her sister Nephthys are depicted as birds of prey in human form. Above the sarcophagus, another scene with four male figures and Isis and Nephthys (in the upper corners) can be seen. In Egyptian mythology, Isis and Nephthys help the deceased to reach the afterlife.
- To the top right of the sarcophagus, two decorative ornaments are depicted, standing on poles: The left ornament shows Anubis and Horus during the Weighing of the heart. This figure refers to the deceased being introduced into the Hall of Judgment, marking the admittance into the realm of the dead. The right ornament shows a solar barque topped by a vulture.
- In front of the sarcophagus on the left side, there is a statue of Thoth. On the right side, both to the front and to the back, two statues of Maat are placed on decorated pedestals.
- On the black drapery which hangs over the side of the barge, a mummification scene is depicted.

== Exhibitions and provenance ==
Funeral of a Mummy on the Nile was exhibited in 1877 in the Salon de Paris. It garnered a lot of attention, became an exhibition favorite and established Bridgman's success as an artist. The painting was praised for its artistic quality, authenticity and strong academic method and was described by art critic Earl Shinn as a "masterpiece". It was considered to be on par with the Orientalist works of Bridgman's teacher Jean-Léon Gérôme by some critics such as Albert Wolff. In the Paris Salon exhibition, the painting earned a third class medal, which was Bridgman's first Salon prize. It was subsequently purchased by James Gordon Bennett Jr., publisher of the New York Herald, for $5000. The painting was then exhibited at the 1878 Exposition Universelle, before disappearing from public view for more than 100 years.

The painting reappeared in 1990 in an auction at Sotheby's in New York. It was purchased by American art collector Wendell Cherry, who donated it to the Speed Art Museum in Louisville, Kentucky, where it is exhibited today.

== Variants ==
Funeral of a Mummy on the Nile (variant)
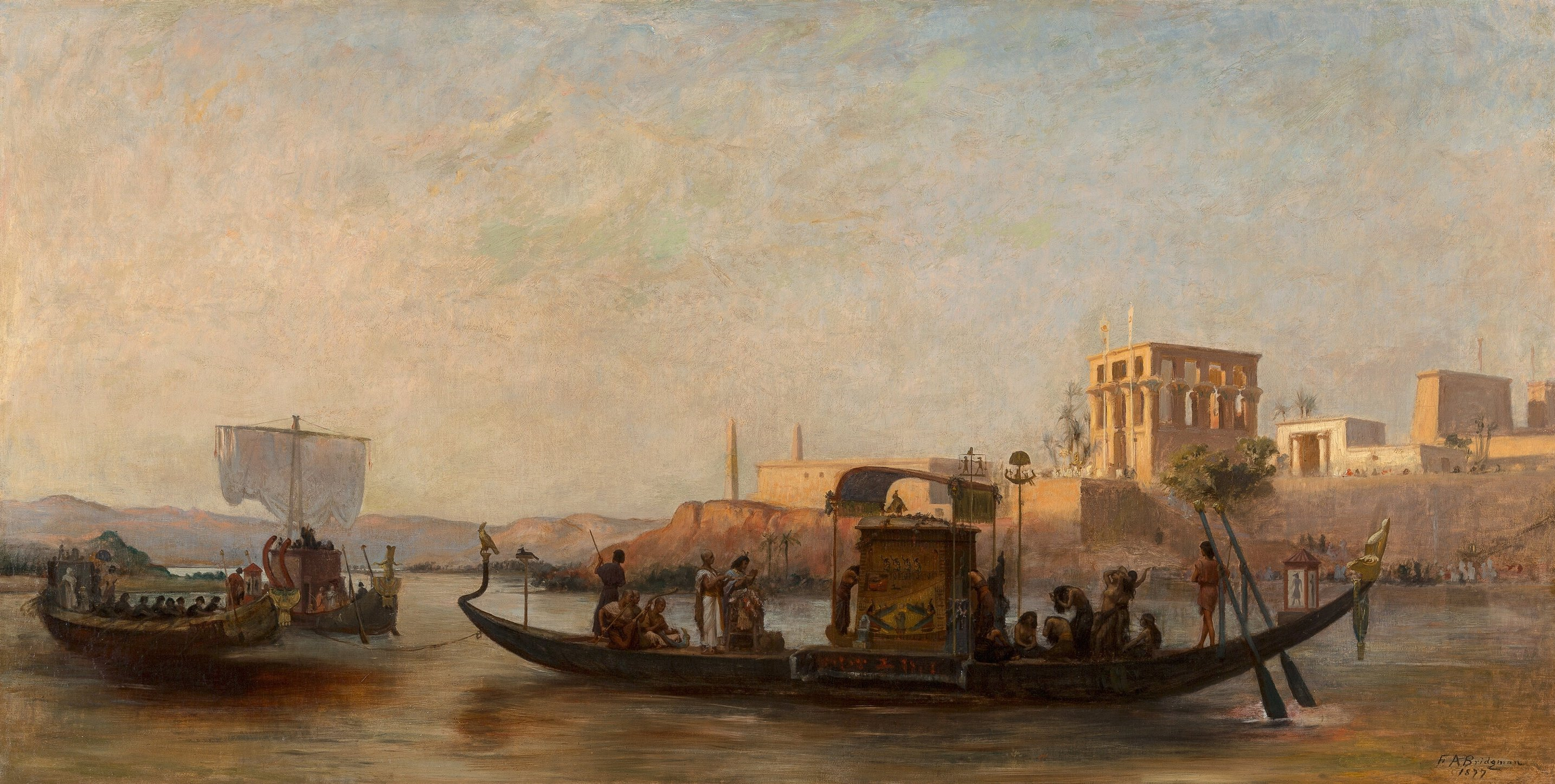
- Variant of the painting, private collection

Bridgman produced two variants of Funeral of a Mummy on the Nile. They were painted on smaller canvases than the original Salon painting, but have a similar composition, as they also feature a funeral barge and two accompanying boats, one of which has a sail, in front of the river shoreline and the sunset sky. The landscape is the most significant difference between the three versions. In the Salon painting, the highest shoreline elevation is on the left side of the canvas, while the highest hills in both variants appear on the right side of the canvas. One of the variants was exhibited in the Royal Academy of Arts in 1881.

On the occasion of the exhibition of Funeral of a Mummy on the Nile at the 1878 Exposition Universelle, Goupil & Cie issued a series of photogravure reproductions of the painting. Two of these prints are presently in the collection of the New York Public Library.
