= Anarchism in Finland =

Anarchism in Finland dates back to the early revolutionary movements of the 20th century, seeing organized activity begin in the 1960s.

== History ==
=== Grand Duchy of Finland ===
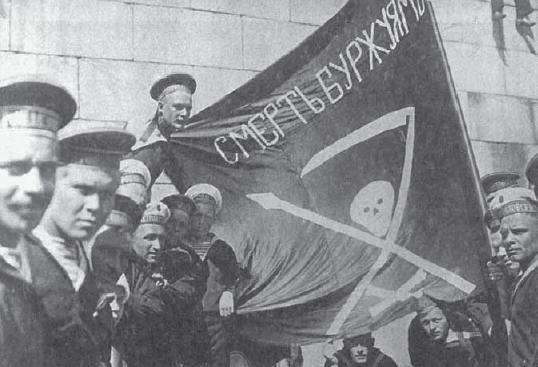
Russian anarchist sailors in Helsinki in 1917.

Supporters of anarchism have been in the country since the time of the Grand Duchy of Finland. There was little support for anarchist ideas in the early 20th century Finnish labor movement, and the country was home to a large number of Russian revolutionaries, soldiers and members of the Tolstoyan movement, some of whom were anarchists. In addition to Russia, anarchist influences flowed to Finland with immigrants who returned from North America. For example, the long-term chairman of the Finnish Seamen's Union, Niilo Wallari, and the musician Hiski Salomaa were both members of the Industrial Workers of the World (IWW). In the United States, there was also a working-class college for Finnish American radicals.

The Finnish Social Democratic Party was influenced by some anarchists in the early 20th century. When Kaapo Murros, who had translated the works of Russian anarchist Peter Kropotkin into Finnish, returned from North America to Finland in 1909, he presented his party colleagues at the SDP Assembly in Kotka with an anarcho-syndicalist line, one skeptical about the possibilities of class struggle from parliament and proposed some kind of decentralized municipal and cooperative strategy. Yrjö Sirola, along with others, attacked such ideas at the meeting, emphasizing the importance of parliamentary work and the fundamental flaws of the general strike tactic. Otto Wille Kuusinen's pamphlet Anarchy and the Revolution, published in Helsinki as early as 1906, reflected the SDP's general attitude towards anarchists. In the booklet, a then-deputy member of the SDP's party committee harshly criticized those on the path to violence and individual terrorism and condemned such practices as "anarchist". The Kotka Assembly called on party branches to be vigilant about such phenomena and to dismiss those involved.

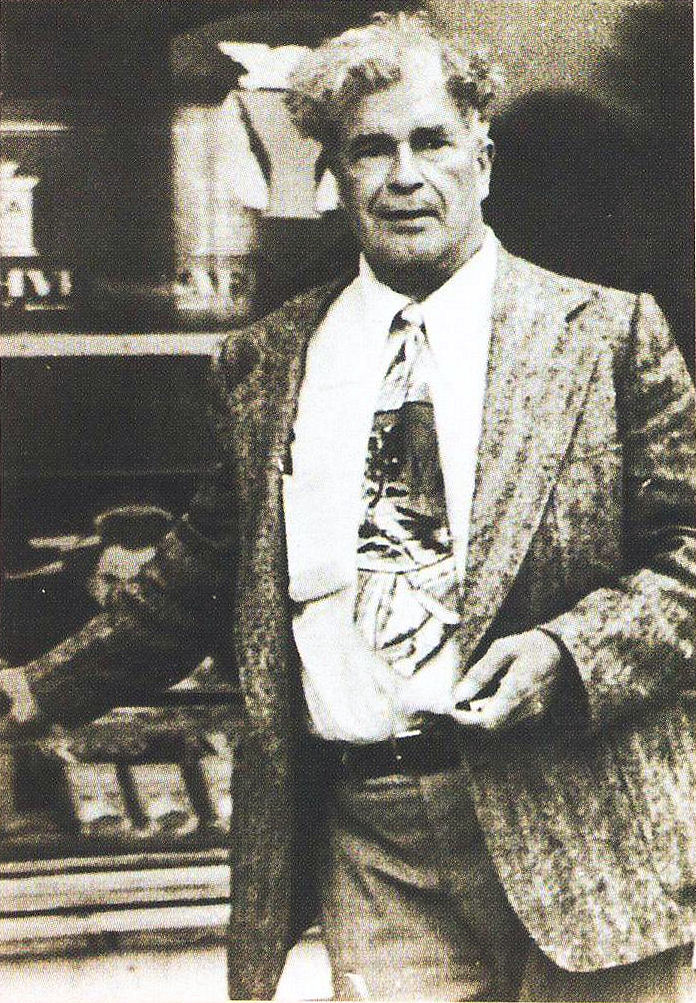
Singer Hiski Salomaa.

The peak period of anarchist activity in Finland is considered to be 1906–1909. After the abolition of the first Red Guards established in connection with the 1905 Revolution, several underground groups began armed action against the tsarist rule in Finland. Some of the groups were anarchist and participated in various acts of terrorism, along with other workers’ activists and the bourgeois Active Resistance Party. By the fall of 1909, the activities of the groups had waned after several of their members had been killed, imprisoned or exiled. The most significant anarchist of the 1910s was Jean Boldt, a Kuopio-born lawyer who had previously been known as a theosophist. In June 1917, anarchists took over St. Nicholas' Church in Helsinki, on the steps of which Boldt had been speaking since the spring. The seizure ended with Boldt's arrest and subsequent riots in which three militants were injured. However, the anarchist meetings continued at Senate Square throughout the summer, even though the authorities had interned Boldt in Niuvanniemi Mental Hospital. In the summer of 1917, the Russian soldiers who stayed in Helsinki established a so-called "Anarchist Club" in the factory located on the site of the present Post Office. Towards the end of the year, Russian anarchists also held the Katajanokka Casino for a while, before the Red Guards took it over in January 1918. During the Finnish Civil War, in March 1918, one Russian and one Finnish anarchist died in an incident between anarchists and the Red Guard militia. According to some estimates, among the Russian military living in Finland, there were even more anarchists than Bolsheviks. Some Russian anarchists also took part in the civil war on the side of the Reds. In February 1918, 250 Tsentrobalt anarchist sailors were involved in the Battle of Ruovesi.

=== Independent Finland ===
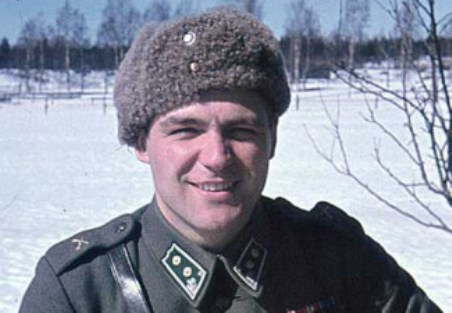
Finnish anarchist Harry Järv during the Winter War.

Organized anarchist activity did not arise in independent Finland until the 1960s. In the country, however, there were individual Finnish anarchists and anarchist Russian emigrants who were sailors and soldiers that took part in the anarchist Kronstadt uprising. More than 6,000 of them arrived in Finland in March 1921. Kronstadt refugees were initially locked up in concentration camps on the Karelian Isthmus, after which some returned to Soviet Russia and others remained permanently in Finland.

In 1933, a poem by the anarchist Kaarlo Uskela, who died eleven years earlier, Pillastunut runohepo was seized and burned by a court decision. It was considered partly atheistic and anti-clerical.

In connection with the 1968 student movement, materials interested in anarchism gathered around the underground movement and Ultra magazine. The anarchist Winnie the Pooh Society also started its activities in Helsinki, where the fight of good against evil was discussed with examples provided by fairy tales. According to Reijo Viitanen, the anarchists even achieved a majority in the Academic Socialist Society for a short time in 1968, but the leading members of the Winnie the Pooh Society soon afterwards turned towards the Finnish Communist Party and Marxism.

In the 1970s and 1980s, there were anarchist discussion circles and some anarchist small magazines appeared. The first national Finnish anarchist organization can be considered the Finnish Anarcho-Syndicalist Association (Finnish: Suomen Anarkosyndikalistinen Liitto, SAL), which started operating in 1986–1988 and changed its name to the Finnish Anarchist Association (Finnish: Suomen Anarkisti Liitto, SAL) in 1992 after the generalization of anarcho-individualism. In 1989, Kapinatyöläinen magazine, which was now published by a Helsinki-based collective, began to appear. The number of members of the SAL rose to two and a half hundred in 1993 at its best. However, the size of the Finnish anarchist movement could not be measured by its membership, due to the structure of the SAL and the fact that anarchists often worked in many other organizations and groups, such as the anti-fascist and the animal rights movement. The SAL's operations waned at the end of the decade. The Finnish Anarchist Association was abolished in 1999. In the autumn of 1996, the anarcho-syndicalist Solidarity Trade Union was established, partly as a competitor to the SAL, but it also ceased to exist in the early 2000s. The eco-anarchist Black Green Days in Tampere gathered hundreds of participants each year at the turn of the millennium. Justice for Animals and Food Not Bombs have also been largely run by anarchists.

In December 1981, member of the French anarchist terrorist group Action Directe Lahouari Benchellal, was arrested for forging traveler's cheques in Helsinki, Finland. He hanged himself while in the custody of the Finnish Security Intelligence Service in January 1982. AD did not believe Benchellal killed himself, and they named a direct action group after him.

=== Contemporary Finland ===
Today, anti-capitalist anarchists operate largely in various civic movements, but also in local anarchist groups around the country. In Helsinki, for example, the Anarchist Action Group started in 2003. Newer anarchist projects include, for example, the Väärinajattelija magazine, Takku.net and other various Internet sites. In the autumn of 2006, students at the University of Helsinki founded an anarchist group called Group A. National anarchist meetings have been held in different parts of Finland. The anarchist festival Musta Pispala has been held in Tampere since autumn 2005.

At the turn of the millennium, the Independence Festival in Helsinki, which took place in 1996–2003 and 2006, received attention on Independence Day. In September 2006, a Smash ASEM demonstration against the Asia–Europe Meeting and an international anarchist meeting were also held in Helsinki. An event in the style of the Independence Festival was revived in 2013 under the name Kiakkovierasjuhlat, when the reception of the President's Independence Day was exceptionally in Tampere. In the punk subculture, the anarchist spirit is doing well in Finland. Even the platinum-class artists like Apulanta use the circle-A in their symbols, but the anarcho, hardcore and crust punk scenes, which took a stronger stand, also have their own loyal supporters. The most well-known anarchists in Finland in the 1990s and 2000s were Ari Vakkilainen and Antti Rautiainen, among others. In 2007, the Anarchist Marthas, a registered Martha organisation, was founded in Finland.

On June 6, 2015, the anarchist alliance Alusta was founded in Helsinki, which included both anarchist individuals and groups. At the time of its establishment, the groups were Group A from Helsinki, Aura from Turku and the Anarchist Karelia Society operating in the North Karelia region. Groups were also established in Tampere, Jyväskylä and Lohja. In addition to this, private individuals joined the association.

According to the police, left-wing anarchists and neo-Nazis in Finland also organized mutual fights, even by prior arrangement. Left-wing anarchists have also infiltrated the HJK's fan base and staged fights around it.

According to the Ministry of the Interior's report on the situation of violent extremism in 2016, the anarchist movement is not very organized, but rather a loose network that communicates via the internet and only gathers from time to time. The most important communication channel is the Takku.net website.

Today, militant antifascists are organized under the name Crow Network and have fought with the Finnish Resistance Movement (SVL). Both parties seek clashes but present their defense. The anti-fascists broke the windows of SVL activists and painted "This is where the Nazi lives" on their walls. Authorities believe the organizations are gradually radicalizing each other.

On October 18, 2014, as the police protected a pre-planned SVL street patrol, another group attacked the patrol. This led to a mass battle of dozens of people. According to a message posted on the Takku site, the opponents were antifascists. The antifascists escaped the police, dropping their iron pipes when the police stopped the fight with pepper spray.

At the end of 2016, the Police of Finland listed Antifa as one of the groups threatening Finland's security. Police estimate that Finnish Antifa's primary targets are the Nordic Resistance Movement and the Soldiers of Odin. In addition, the Police suggested that other anti-immigration or right-wing groups may also be targeted by Antifa.

On October 22, 2017, anti-fascists staged a counter-demonstration in Tampere against a demonstration by the neo-Nazi Nordic Resistance Movement. According to police, among the protesters, torches were thrown at the police and attempts were made to catch the neo-Nazis, who were protected by the police. Police are investigating the actions of protesters in a suspected violent riot.

In 2019, according to the Ministry of the Interior, there were violent far-left groups in some areas in Finland, mostly anarchists and antifascists. The radical movement has been limited and has mainly manifested itself in demonstrations.

== See also ==
- Category:Finnish anarchists
- List of anarchist movements by region
- Anarchism in Norway
- Anarchism in Russia
- Anarchism in Sweden
