= Finnish Electrical Workers' Union =

Trade union of Finland

- Sähköalojen ammattiliitto
- Enemmän voimaa yhdessä (English: More Power Together)

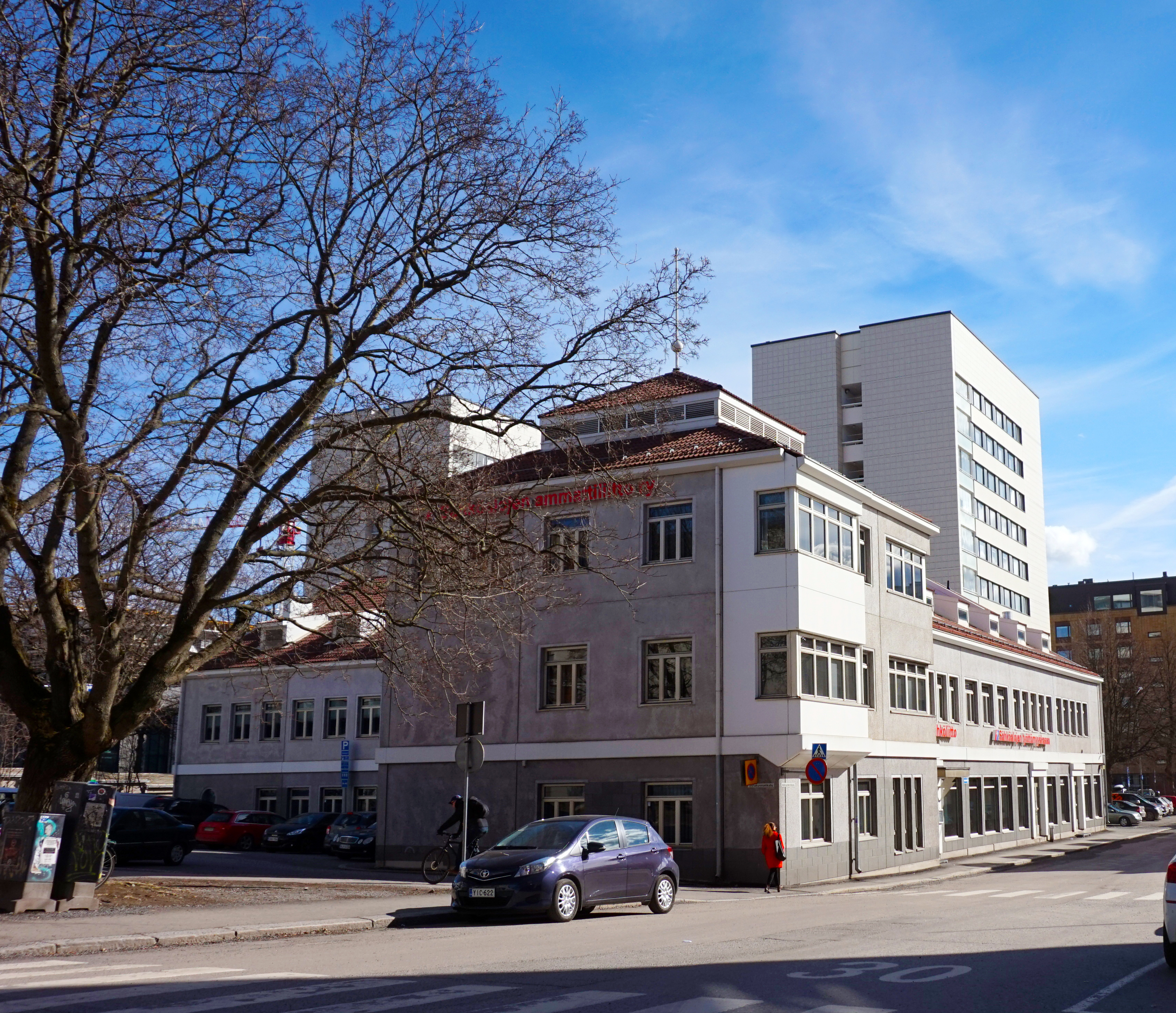
- Headquarters in Tampere
- Abbreviation: Sähköliitto
- Established: 1955; 71 years ago
- Type: Trade union
- Headquarters: Tampere
- Location: Finland
- Field: Electric power industry
- Members: 34000 (2020)
- Official languages: Finnish, Swedish
- Chairperson: Jari Korpela
- Website: sahkoliitto.fi

The Finnish Electrical Workers' Union (Finnish: Sähköalojen ammattiliitto, Sähköliitto) is a trade union representing electrical workers in Finland.

The union was founded in 1955, as a split from the Metalworkers' Union. The Metalworkers prevented the new union from joining the Finnish Federation of Trade Unions (SAK), but in 1963, it was accepted into the rival Finnish Trade Union Federation (SAJ). The SAK and SAJ merged in 1969, forming the Central Organisation of Finnish Trade Unions, of which the Electrical Workers have held continuous membership.

By 1998, the union had 29,009 members, and by 2020, this had risen to 34,000. It took part in the negotiations which formed the Industrial Union TEAM, but ultimately remained independent.

== Presidents ==
1955: Erkki Pohjolainen
1976: Vilho Pekkonen
1986: Seppo Salisma
1997: Lauri Lyly
2004: Martti Alakoski
2016: Tero Heiniluoma
2016: Sauli Väntti
