= Joint Organisation of State Employees =

Trade union of Finland

The Joint Organisation of State Employees (Finnish: Valtion yhteisjärjestö, VTY) was a trade union federation bringing together public sector workers in Finland.

The federation was established in 1921 and became known as the Federation of Civil Servants. Most of its affiliates left the Finnish Federation of Trade Unions (SAK) in the late 1950s, so in 1961, it was reconstituted to act as the national trade union centre for these unions. In 1969, it was again reformed, as the Joint Organisation of State Employees, and it became a founding affiliate of the Central Organisation of Finnish Trade Unions, successor to the SAK.

The affiliates of the federation declined over time; for example, the Railway Workers' Union and Union of Locomotive Drivers were affiliated until 1995. In 1998, it had 28,514 members. By 2005, the federation's affiliates were:

- Coastguard Union (MVL)
- Finnish Custom Officers' Union (TL)
- Prison Officers' Union (VVL)
- State and Special Employees' Union (VAL)

In addition, state employees in the Municipal Workers' Union (KTV), Metalworkers' Union, Finnish Seamen's Union, and the Finnish Musicians' Union were part of the federation.

In 2005, the union merged with the KTV and the VAL, to form the Public and Welfare Services Union.
