= Ann Selin =

Finnish trade unionist (born 1960)

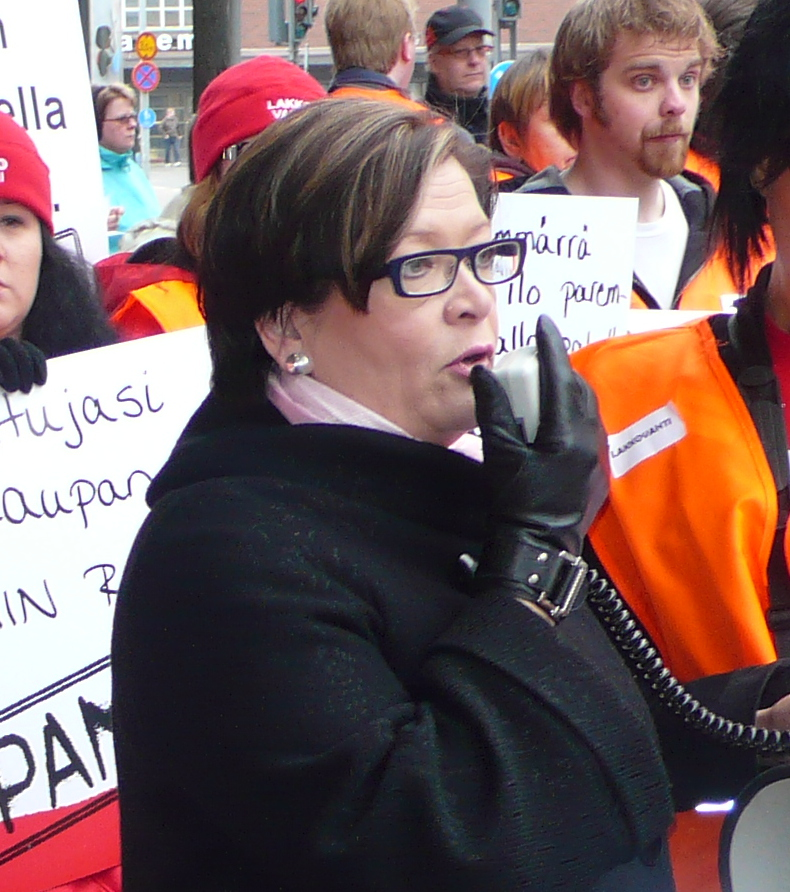
Selin in 2010

Ann Orvokki Selin (born 22 July 1960) is a Finnish former trade union leader.

Born in Helsinki, Selin began working in 1976, as a clerk for the Commercial Workers' Union. In 1987, the union merged into the Business Union, for which Selin became a youth officer. In 1991, she moved to work on health and safety, and then from 1993 she was a regional secretary in Jyväskylä.

In 2000, the Business Union merged into the new Service Union United (PAM), continuing as a regional secretary. In 2002, she became the union's president.

As leader of PAM, Selin negotiated an industry-wide agreement for paternity leave. She advocated tripartism, and the avoidance of industrial action. She also backed the Baltic Organising Academy, which aimed to support union recruitment and organisation in the Baltic countries, and served on the international and European boards of the UNI Global Union.

In 2014, Selin was elected as the president of the UNI, serving for four years. She retired as president of PAM in 2019, but announced that she planned to continue to work for the union.

Trade union offices
Preceded by Maj-Len Remahl	President of the Service Union United; 2002–2019	Succeeded by Annika Rönni-Sallinen
Preceded by Joe de Bruyn	President of the UNI Global Union; 2014–2018	Succeeded by Ruben Cortina
