= Group A (disambiguation) =

Group A was a set of motor racing regulations for touring and rally cars.

Group A may also refer to:

- Group A Sports Cars, a set of Australian motor racing regulations used for prototype Sports Racing Cars
- Group A, one group of the List of U.S. Army weapons by supply catalog designation
- Group A, an anti-authoritarian political group in Helsinki, Finland
- The original name of Alpha Group
- Group A streptococcal infection, a medical condition
- Group A posts in the Civil Services of India
- One of six or eight groups of four teams competing at the FIFA World Cup
  - 2022 FIFA World Cup Group A
  - 2018 FIFA World Cup Group A
  - 2014 FIFA World Cup Group A
  - 2010 FIFA World Cup Group A
  - 2006 FIFA World Cup Group A
  - 2002 FIFA World Cup Group A
  - 1998 FIFA World Cup Group A
  - 1994 FIFA World Cup Group A
  - 1990 FIFA World Cup Group A

== See also ==
- Group B (disambiguation)
