= Finnish Transport Workers' Union =

Trade union of Finland

- Auto- ja Kuljetusalan Työntekijäliitto

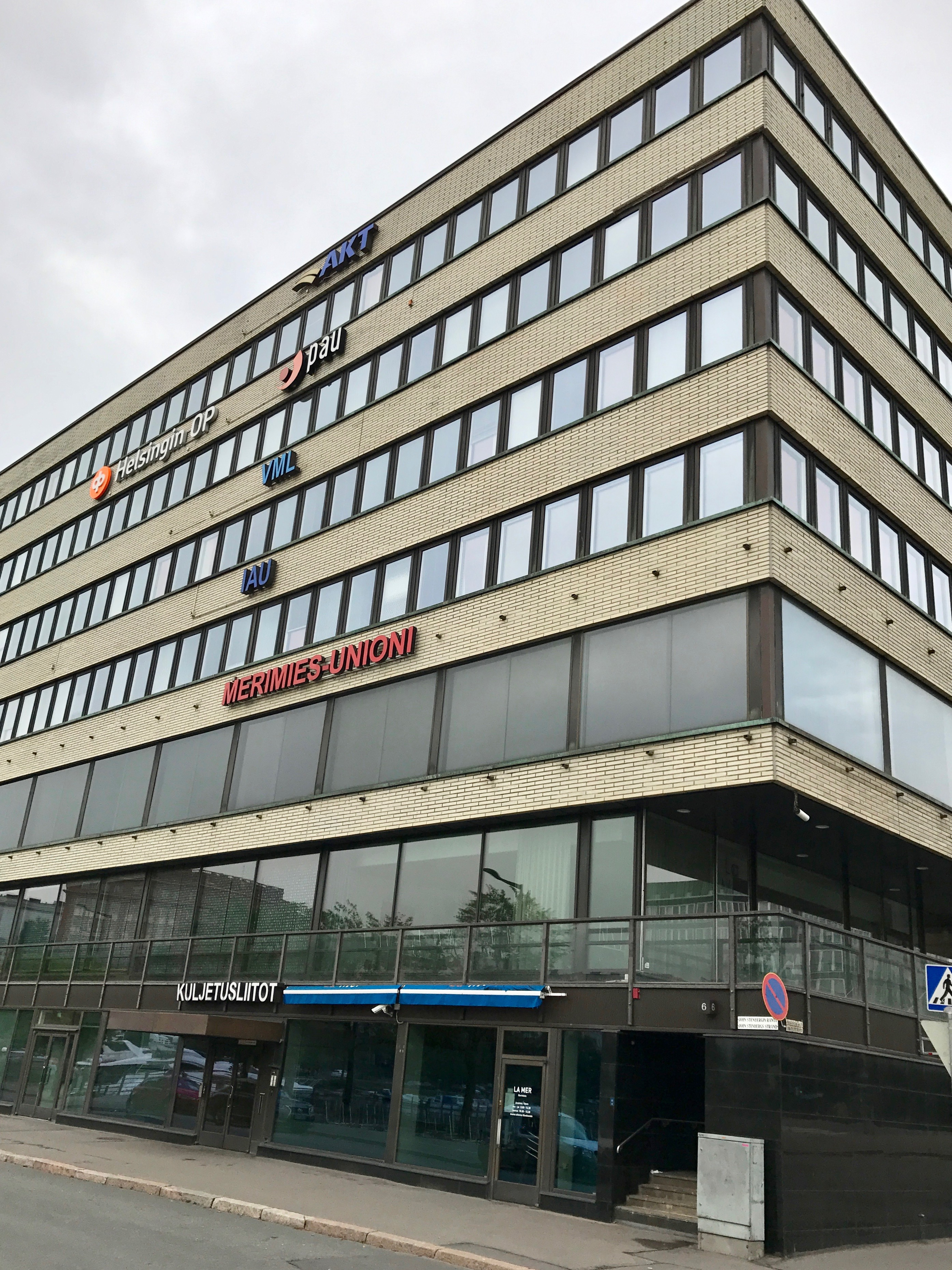
- Headquarters in Helsinki
- Abbreviation: AKT
- Predecessor: Automobile and Transport Workers' Union; Finnish Road Transport Union; Finnish Port Workers' Union
- Founded: 1970; 56 years ago
- Type: Trade union
- Headquarters: Helsinki
- Location: Finland
- Field: Transport
- Members: 45,000 (2021)
- Key people: Marko Piirainen (President)
- Affiliations: Central Organisation of Finnish Trade Unions; Nordic Transport Workers' Union; European Transport Workers' Union; International Transport Workers' Federation
- Website: www.akt.fi

The Finnish Transport Workers' Union (Finnish: Auto- ja Kuljetusalan Työntekijäliitto, AKT) is a trade union representing transport workers in Finland.

The union was founded in 1970, when the Automobile and Transport Workers' Union merged with the Finnish Road Transport Union, and the Finnish Port Workers' Union. Some of these unions had been affiliated to the Finnish Federation of Trade Unions, and some to the Finnish Trade Union Federation. Soon after these two federations merged to form the Central Organisation of Finnish Trade Unions, the transport unions also merged.

By 1998, the union had 49,849 members, and this figure has remained fairly consistent. The union is based in Helsinki, and is divided into 121 professional groups. It is a member of the Nordic Transport Workers' Union, the European Transport Workers' Union, and the International Transport Workers' Federation.

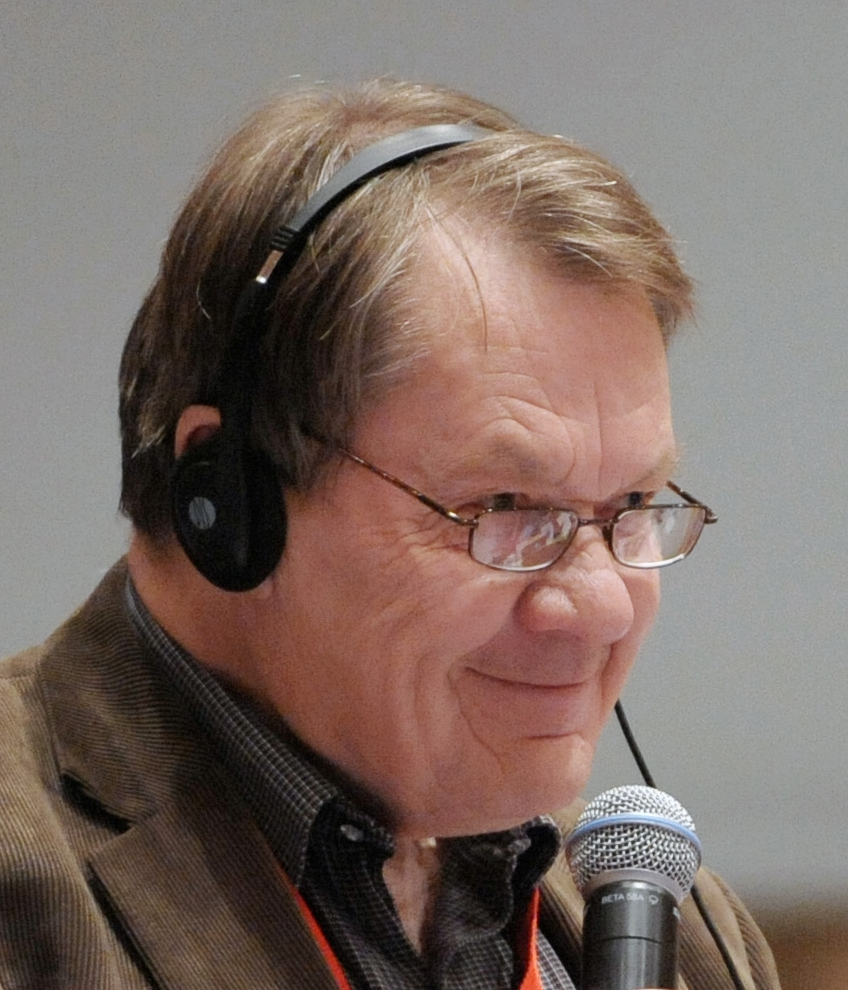
Risto Kuisma, the union's longest-serving president

== Presidents ==
- 1970–1978: Martti Veirto
- 1978–1994: Risto Kuisma
- 1994–2001: Kauko Lehikoinen
- 2001–2012: Timo Räty
- 2012–present: Marko Piirainen
