= Finnish General Workers' Union =

Trade union of Finland

- Suomen Työläisliitto
- Formation: 1930
- Dissolved: 1970; 56 years ago
- Type: General union
- Parent organization: Finnish Federation of Trade Unions

The Finnish General Workers' Union (Finnish: Suomen Työläisliitto) was a general union representing workers in Finland.

The union was established in 1930 by the Social Democratic Party, to accept workers who had resigned from the Finnish Trade Union Federation (SAJ), unhappy at its communist leadership. The SAJ was banned later in the year, and the General Workers' Union became the core of the new Finnish Federation of Trade Unions (SAK), although many of its members transferred to newly-formed, industry-specific unions.

By 1955, the union had 10,713 members. It remained affiliated to the SAK when many unions left to form a new Finnish Trade Union Federation, which in 1969 merged with the SAK to form the Central Organisation of Finnish Trade Unions. The General Workers' Union affiliated to the new federation, its membership having grown to 15,766.

By 1970, most of the union's membership was in the chemical industry and general manufacturing. That year, it merged with the majority of the General and Speciality Workers' Union, to form the Chemical Workers' Union.
