= KNL =

KNL may refer to:

- Kazakh National League
- Kensal Green station, London, National Rail station code
- Knights Landing (microarchitecture), an Intel Xeon Phi microarchitecture
- Korea National League
- Textile and Knitting Workers' Union, a former trade union in Finland

== See also ==
- Knights Landing, California, US
