= General and Speciality Workers' Union =

Trade union of Finland

The General and Speciality Workers' Union (Finnish: Yleis- ja erikoisalojen ammattiliitto, YEA) was a general union in Finland.

The union was founded in 1960, as a split from the Finnish Food Workers' Union (SEL). At the time, the SEL was led by communists, as was the Finnish Federation of Trade Unions (SAK), to which it was affiliated. Supporters of the Social Democratic Party formed the Finnish Trade Union Federation (SAJ), and SEL members who wished to affiliate to the SAJ formed the "General and Speciality Workers' Union".

As the union's name suggested, it was a general union and accepted workers from other industries who were not eligible to join another SAJ-affiliated union, including chemical workers. This enabled it to grow rapidly, and by 1968, the union had 12,000 members.

In 1969, the SAJ and the SAK merged, to form the Central Organisation of Finnish Trade Unions. The YEA affiliated to the new federation, as did the SEL. In 1970, the union was split up, with the food industry workers rejoining the SEL, while workers in miscellaneous trades mostly joined the new Chemical Workers' Union.
