= Rural Workers' Union =

Trade union of Finland

- Maaseututyöväen Liitto
- Formation: 1945
- Founder: Multiple divisions of the Finnish General Workers' Union
- Dissolved: 1993; 33 years ago
- Publication: Maaseudun Työ; Maaseututyöväen Viesti
- Parent organization: SAK
- Formerly called: Suomen Maa- ja Sekatyöväen Liitto, 'Agricultural and Allied Workers' Union' (until 1953)

The Rural Workers' Union (Finnish: Maaseututyöväen liitto, ML) was a trade union representing agricultural and forestry workers in Finland.

The union was founded in 1945 as the Agricultural and Allied Workers' Union, and affiliated to the Finnish Federation of Trade Unions (SAK). Initially, it mainly represented farm workers, with forestry workers instead joining the Forestry and Lumber Workers' Union (SMUL). In 1949, the SMUL was involved in an unauthorised strike, which led to a riot in Kemi, and was expelled from the SAK, with the ML taking over responsibility for unionising forestry workers. The SMUL finally merged into the ML in 1959, and this greatly strengthened the union's position, with it finally able to negotiate national agreements on pay and working conditions.

From 1969, the union was affiliated to the SAK's successor, the Central Organisation of Finnish Trade Unions. In the 1970s, it absorbed the Finnish Forest Workers' Union, and small union founded by the Finnish Agrarian Party, and by 1992, it had 19,310 members. The following year, it merged with the Wood Workers' Union, to form the Wood and Allied Workers' Union.
