= Postal Union =

Trade union of Finland

- Postiliitto
- Merged with: Postal Officers' Union
- Successor: Post and Logistics Union
- Founded: 1906
- Dissolved: 2005
- Location: Finland
- Members: 26,153 (1998)
- Parent organization: Joint Organisation of State Employees
- Affiliations: Central Organisation of Finnish Trade Unions

The Postal Union (Finnish: Postiliitto) was a trade union representing postal workers in Finland.

The first conference of postal service workers in Finland was held in 1901, but only in 1906 did they agree to form a union, at a meeting in Tampere.

In 1945, the union affiliated to the Finnish Federation of Trade Unions, but it resigned in 1960, instead joining the Joint Organisation of State Employees (VTY). Through this federation, in 1969, it became affiliated to the Central Organisation of Finnish Trade Unions (SAK). In 1995, it left the VTY and affiliated to the SAK in its own right. By 1998, it had 26,153 members.

From 2000, the union worked increasingly closely with the Postal Officers' Union, and the two merged in 2005, forming the Post and Logistics Union.
