= The Platform (Finland) =

- The Platform
- Alusta
- Formation: 6 June 2015; 11 years ago
- Purpose: Anarchism

The Platform (Finnish: Alusta) is a Finnish anarchist association which was founded on 6 June 2015. Its activities are reminiscent of the Finnish Anarchist Association, which ceased functioning in 1999, and is designed to attract more people to anarchist activities. The Platform has no leadership or chairman, as it does not fit into the alliance’s anti-authoritarian ideology.

The members of the Platform are Group A in Helsinki, Aura in Turku and the Anarchist Karelian Society in North Karelia. The Tampere Anarchist Association (TAL) also says that it belongs to the Platform on its Facebook page. According to the Platform, in its founding announcement, there were also groups on the ground in Jyväskylä and Lohja.

The financial affairs of the Platform and the Finnish Anarchist Black Cross are handled by an association called the Support of the Finnish Anarchist Movement. Antti Rautiainen says that Alusta must act in monetary matters within the capitalist system so that no one gets into legal problems. The founding meeting of the Platform lasted a couple of days.

The Platform has planned campaigns against fascism and racism. It has also been involved in organizing mass demonstrations.
