= Finnish Food Workers' Union =

Trade union of Finland

- Suomen Elintarviketyöläisten Liitto
- Formation: 1932; 94 years ago
- Type: Trade union
- Headquarters: Helsinki
- President: Veli-Matti Kuntonen
- Publication: Elintae

The Finnish Food Workers' Union (Finnish: Suomen Elintarviketyöläisten Liitto, SEL) is a trade union representing workers in the food industry in Finland.

The Finnish Food and Drink Workers' Union was established in 1905, but banned in 1930. As a temporary measure, the new Finnish Federation of Trade Unions (SEK) admitted food workers to the Finnish General Workers' Union, but in December 1932, it split them into a new Finnish Food Workers' Union.

From 1945, the union was led by Kalle Lindholm, a member of the Finnish Communist Party. While a minority of Social Democratic Party supporters left in 1960 to join the rival General and Speciality Workers' Union, this rejoined the SEL in 1970, soon after the SEK merged into the new Central Organisation of Finnish Trade Unions. The SEL's membership grew rapidly, and by 1998 had reached 43,497. By 2020, this had fallen to 30,047.

== Presidents ==
1932: Lauri Pöyhönen
1941: I. K. Björk
1941: Lauri Pöyhönen
1945: Kalle Lindholm
1949: Armas Reunamo
1951: Eero Teri
1953: Arvo Hautala
1966: Urpo Virtanen
1969: Jarl Sund
1991: Ritva Savtschenko
2006: Veli-Matti Kuntonen
