= Maj-Len Remahl =

Finnish trade union leader (born 1942)

- Born: Maj-Len Anita Rönnholm; 3 December 1942 (age 83); Vaasa, Finland
- Occupation: Trade union leader
- Years active: 1976–2003

Maj-Len Anita Remahl (née Rönnholm; born 3 December 1942) is a Finnish former trade union leader.

Born in Vaasa as Maj-Len Rönnholm, she grew up in a Swedish-speaking family in Sepänkylä, then in Palosaari and Huutoniemi. She was educated at the Vaasa Svenska Flicklyceum and the Vaasa handelsläroverk, then took various jobs in administration. She married in 1961 and had her first child the same year. During her maternity leave, she became active in the Finnish Social Democratic Party (SDP).

Remahl joined the Union of Salaried Employees (STL) in 1972, and in 1976 was appointed as the union's first regional secretary for Central Finland. In 1980, after her second child was born, she moved to work as a regional administrator for the Commercial Workers' Union, to reduce the travel required.

In 1986, Remahl was elected as president of the union. Despite having the backing of the union's general secretary and the previous president, she was little known in the union, her campaign boosted when the Finnish Government passed that year's Equality Act. The following year, the union took part in a merger which formed the Business Union, Remahl continuing as president of the new union.

In 1999, Remahl was elected as president of the International Federation of Commercial, Clerical, Professional and Technical Employees (FIET), the first woman to hold the post. At the end of the year, FIET merged into the new UNI Global Union, and Remahl was elected as its president in 2001. At the time, it was noted that this was the largest global union federation to have had a Finnish president. Similarly, in 2000, the Business Union merged into the new Service Union United, and Remahl became its first president. She retired from her union posts in 2002 and 2003.

Trade union offices
Preceded by Kauko Suhonen	President of the Commercial Workers' Union; 1986–1987	Succeeded by Union merged
Preceded by Union founded	President of the Business Union; 1987–2000	Succeeded by Union merged
Preceded by Gary Nebeker	President of the International Federation of Commercial, Clerical, Professional and Technical Employees; 1999	Succeeded by Federation merged
Preceded by Federation founded	President of the Service Union United; 2000–2002	Succeeded by Ann Selin
Preceded by Kurt van Haaren	President of the UNI Global Union; 2001–2003	Succeeded by Joseph T. Hansen
