= Liljeström =

Liljeström is a Swedish surname. Notable people with the surname include:

- Inga Liljeström, Australian experimental vocalist and producer
- Valdemar Liljeström (1902–1960), Finnish trade union activist and politician
