= Union of Clothing Workers =

Trade union of Finland

The Union of Clothing Workers (Finnish: Suomen Vaatetustyöläisten liitto, SVL) was a trade union representing workers in the clothes industry in Finland.

The first Finnish Clothing Workers' Union was banned in 1930. The Workers' Union gained responsibility for organising clothing workers, setting up branches for clothing workers. This approach proved unsuccessful, with only 898 workers holding membership of the branches by the start of 1938. As a result, on 1 January 1938, the Union of Clothing Workers was founded, and the Workers' Union's clothing branches transferred into it.

The new union affiliated to the Finnish Federation of Trade Unions (SAK) and grew rapidly. It proved particularly successful at recruiting women, and workers in the rapidly expanding clothing factories. By 1945, it had 6,103 members, of whom 89.8% were women. In 1960, it became a founding affiliate of the Finnish Trade Union Federation (SAJ)

In 1969, the SAK and the SAJ merged to form the Central Organisation of Finnish Trade Unions. In response, the following year, the Union of Clothing Workers merged with the Textile and Knitting Workers' Union, and the Textile Workers' Union, to form the Textile and Clothing Workers' Union.
