= JHL =

JHL may refer to:

- Jung Hoo Lee, South Korean baseball player
- Junior Hockey League (Russia)
- Fort MacKay/Albian Aerodrome (IATA airport code), Alberta, Canada
- Public and Welfare Services Union (Julkisten ja hyvinvointialojen liitto), Finland
