= Paperworkers' Union =

Trade union of Finland

- Paperiliitto
- Formation: 1906; 120 years ago
- Type: Trade union
- Headquarters: Helsinki
- President: Petri Vanhala
- Publication: Paperiliitto

The Paperworkers' Union (Finnish: Paperiliitto) is a trade union representing workers in the paper industry, in Finland.

== History ==
The union was established in 1906, on the initiative of the Tampere Paper Industry Workers' Union. Initially a successful organisation, it split in 1930 between supporters of the Social Democratic Party (SDP) and a communist-led group. The communist group was soon banned, so the SDP's Finnish Paper Industry Workers' Union viewed itself as the successor of the earlier union.

The union affiliated to the Finnish Federation of Trade Unions, and then from 1969, to its successor, the Central Organisation of Finnish Trade Unions. By 1998, it had 49,618 members, but by 2019, this had fallen to 34,021, of whom only 14,000 were actively employed in the industry.

Despite its decline in membership, the union decided against joining the Industrial Union TEAM, founded in 2010, or its successor, the Industrial Union.

== Presidents ==
1906: Aksel Pynnönen
1907: Ville Salonen
1908: Kalle Salminen
1910: K. A. Koskinen
1917: Eino Rissanen
1919: Kalle Koivunen
1922: Aleksi Ulanen
1929: Santtu Vuorio
1935: Hjalmar Lappalainen
1946: Pentti Lundström
1949: Vihtori Rantanen
1955: Veikko Ahtola
1978: Antero Mäki
1993: Jarmo Lähteenmäki
2003: Jouko Ahonen
2011: Petri Vanhala
