= SSSL =

SSSL can stand for:

- Finnish Social Democratic Journalists' Union (Finnish: Suomen Sosialidemokraattinen Sanomalehtimiesliitto), trade union in Finland
- Sinasina Sign Language, sign language used in part of Papua New Guinea
- Stop Snitchin, Stop Lyin, album by The Game
