= Finnish Media Union =

Trade union of Finland

The Finnish Media Union (Finnish: Viestintäalan ammattiliitto) was a trade union representing printing industry workers in Finland.

The union was founded in 1894, as the Finnish Printers' and Bookbinders' Union. It affiliated to the Finnish Trade Union Federation, then the Finnish Federation of Trade Unions until 1956, when it resigned. In 1960, it was a founder member of a new Finnish Trade Union Federation, but it resigned from it in 1967. From 1969, it held membership of the Central Organisation of Finnish Trade Unions. By 1998, the union had 29,100 members.

In 2008, the union entered talks with six manufacturing unions about a possible merger. Ultimately, only the Finnish Media Union and the Chemical Union persevered with the talks, and at the end of 2009, the two merged, to form the Industrial Union TEAM.
