= Textile Workers' Union (Finland) =

Trade union of Finland

The Textile Workers' Union (Finnish: Tekstiilityöväen Liitto) was a trade union representing workers in the textile industry in Finland.

The Textile and Knitting Workers' Union was affiliated to the Finnish Federation of Trade Unions (SAK) until 1960 but then joined the Finnish Trade Union Federation (SAJ) split. The SAK decided to create a new union, to represent textile workers who wished to remain affiliated to the SAK. By 1970, it had 34,003 members.

In 1969, the SAK and the SAJ merged to form the Central Organisation of Finnish Trade Unions. In response, the following year, the Textile Workers' Union merged with the Textile and Knitting Workers' Union, and the Union of Clothing Workers, to form the Textile and Clothing Workers' Union.
