= Chemical Workers' Union (Finland) =

Trade union of Finland

The Chemical Workers' Union (Finnish: Kemian Työntekijäin Liitto, KTL) was a trade union representing workers in the chemical industry in Finland.

The union was founded in 1970, with the merger of the Finnish General Workers' Union and many workers from the General and Speciality Workers' Union. The new union affiliated to the Central Organisation of Finnish Trade Unions.

By the 1980s, the union was keen to collaborate with others in the light industries, and in 1990, it began investigating a merger with the Rubber and Leather Workers' Union. The two eventually merged in 1993, with a new Chemical Union founded on 24 October.
