= Martha Organization =

Finnish organisation

- Marttaliitto ry
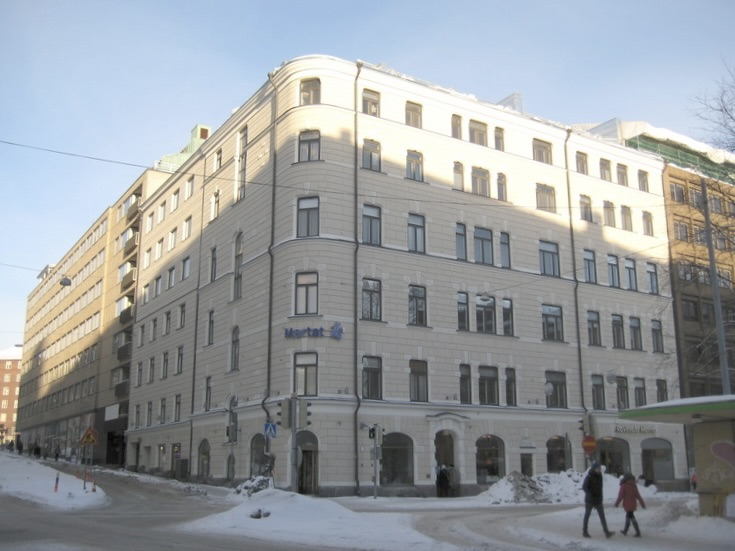
- This building, owned by the Martha Organisation, is located in Kamppi, Helsinki, at Lapinlahdenkatu 3. The Martha suborganisation of Uusimaa’s premises are also located inside the building.
- Nickname: Marthas
- Formation: 29 March 1899; 127 years ago
- Type: NGO
- Headquarters: Lapinlahdenkatu 3, Helsinki, Finland
- Location: Finland
- Members: c. 44,000
- Secretary General: Marianne Heikkilä
- Key people: Annie Furuhjelm, Lucina Hagman, Cely Mechelin, Dagmar Neovius, Alli Nissinen and Helmi Setälä
- Website: www.martat.fi

The Martha Organization (Finnish: Marttaliitto ry or Martat, Swedish: Martharörelsen), also known as the Marthas and the Martha Association, is a Finnish organisation founded by Lucina Hagman in 1899. The organisation defines its activities as follows: "The Martha Organization is a citizens' organisation providing advice in home economics, with the aim of furthering welfare in homes and families, and providing diverse activities and possibilities of influencing the community and its members." The Martha Organization takes its name from the biblical figure of Martha.

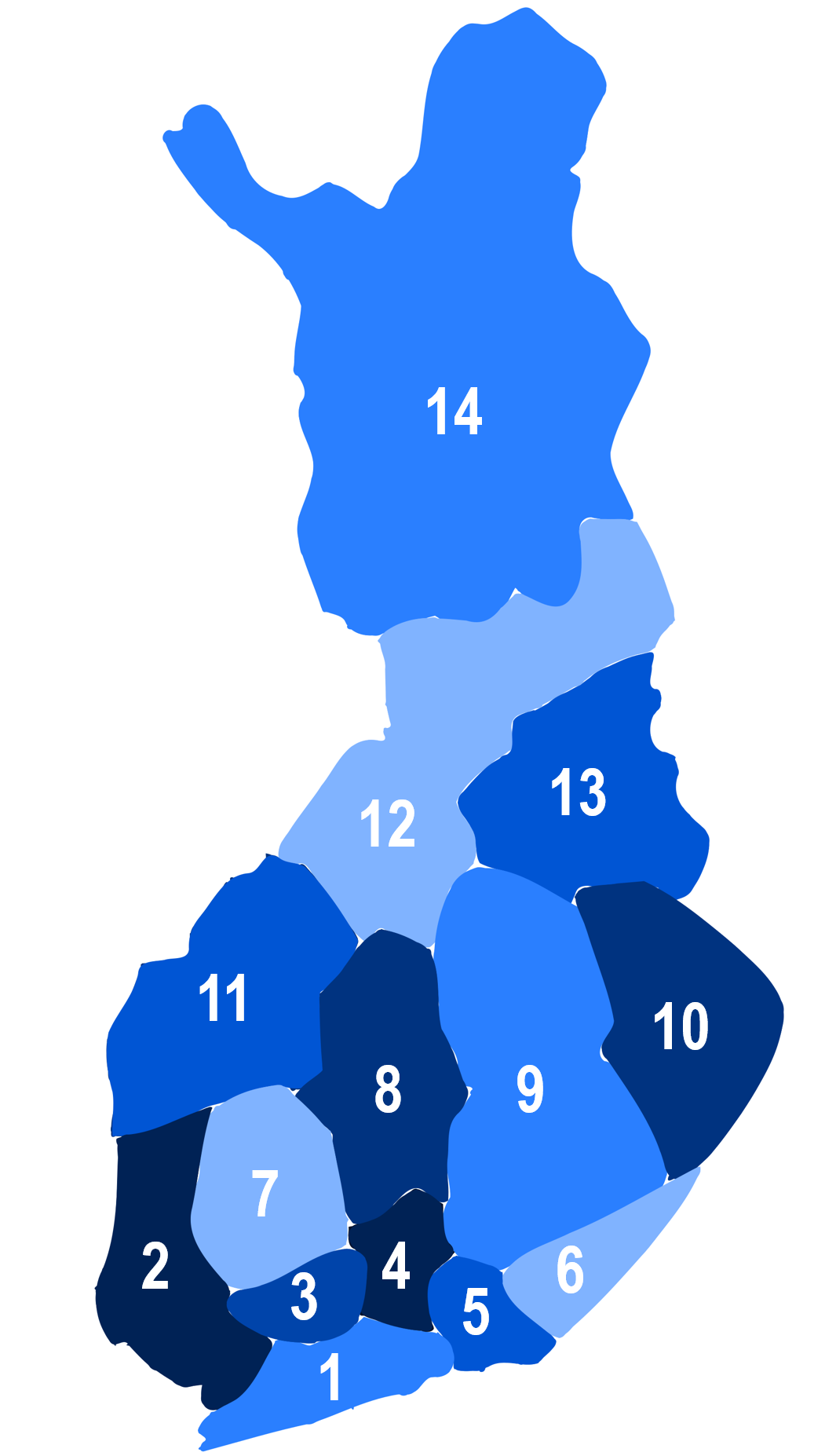
The regional Martha suborganisations in 2018.

The organisation has a three-tier structure. The lowest tier consists of local Martha communities and clubs, which the members belong to. These communities belong to regional Martha suborganisations. The Martha Organization itself is the central organisation. The members of the Martha Organization, called Martta, number about 50,000. The Martha communities now also accept male members. They are called Martti or Matti.

Whereas the organisation's activity was previously focused mainly on the countryside, the organisation has lately sought to expand to cities. University students have also formed Martha communities. Men have founded Martti clubs. The Swedish clubs have their own national organisation called Swedish Martha Association in Finland (Swedish: Finlands svenska Marthaförbund or Marthaförbundet).

The organisation publishes a magazine called Martat that comes out six times a year. The magazine was formerly named Emäntälehti Martat.

In 2007, Finnish anarchists established their own Martha Organization based on anarchist principles. The Anarchist Marthas have operations in Helsinki and Rovaniemi. It had about 130 members in 2011. The Anarchist Marthas organised popular public knitting clubs, among other events.
