= Wood Workers' Union =

Trade union of Finland

The Wood Workers' Union (Finnish: Puutyöväen liitto, SPL) was a trade union representing wood industry workers in Finland.

The Wood Workers' Union was founded in 1925, but was banned in 1930. Later that year, supporters of the Social Democratic Party (SDP) founded a new Finnish Wood Workers' Union, which affiliated to the Finnish Federation of Trade Unions (SAK). By 1958, the SDP supporters had been marginalised in the SAK, leading the Wood Workers to disaffiliate. In 1960, it became a founding affiliate of the Finnish Trade Union Federation (SAJ), while the SAK established a new rival, the Wood Workers' Federation (PTTL).

In 1961, the union renamed itself as the Finnish Wood Industry Workers' Union. The SAK and SAJ merged in 1969, forming the Central Organisation of Finnish Trade Unions, which both the SPL and the PTTL joined. The PTTL finally rejoined the SPL in 1973, which renamed itself as the "Wood Workers' Union".

By 1992, the union had 37,150 members. The following year, it merger with the Rural Workers' Union, to form the Wood and Allied Workers' Union.
