= Railway Workers' Union (Finland) =

Trade union of Finland

The Railway Workers' Union (Finnish: Rautatieläisten Liitto, RAUTL) was a trade union representing workers in the railway industry in Finland.

The union was founded in 1930, following the banning of its immediate forerunner. It affiliated to the Finnish Federation of Trade Unions (SAK), and by 1955, it had 12,063 members.

In 1969, the SAK merged into the Central Organisation of Finnish Trade Unions. The Railway Workers affiliated to the Joint Organisation of State Employees (VTY), which in turn affiliated to the new federation. This arrangement survived until 1996, when the Railway Workers left the VTY, and affiliated directly to the federation.

By 1998, the union had 17,330 members. At the start of 2012, it merged into the Public and Welfare Services Union (JHL). The JHL created a Railway Professionals section, bringing together former RAUTL members with those working on tramways.
