= Finnish Elite Athletes' Union =

Trade union of Finland

- Suomen Huippu-urheilijoiden Unioni
- Established: 2002; 24 years ago
- Type: Trade union
- Location: Finland
- Field: Professional sports
- Members: 2,600
- Official language: Finnish
- Affiliations: SAK

The Finnish Elite Athlete's Union (Finnish: Suomen Huippu-urheilijoiden Unioni, SHU) is a trade union representing professional sportspeople in Finland.

The union was founded in 2002 and consists of associations for specific sports, plus a section for individual athletes. It has about 2,600 members, with about 1,500 being football players. Unusually for a trade union, it does not involve itself in wage negotiations, but focuses on social security, and helping athletes prepare for life after their sporting career has finished.

In 2012, the union affiliated to the Central Organisation of Finnish Trade Unions.

== Sections ==
- Basketball Players' Association
- Elite Baseball Players
- Finnish Ice Hockey
- Football Players' Union
- Race Athletes' Association
