= Prison Officers' Union =

Trade union of Finland

The Prison Officers' Union (Finnish: Vankilavirkailijain Liitto, VVL) is a trade union representing prison and probation staff in Finland.

The union was founded in 1895. From 1945 until 1960, it was affiliated to the Finnish Federation of Trade Unions (SAK). It also joined the Federation of Civil Servants, and when in 1969 that became the Joint Organisation of State Employees (VTY), it became indirectly affiliated to the SAK's successor, the Central Organisation of Finnish Trade Unions.

In 2005, the VTY became part of the new Public and Welfare Services Union (JHL), to which the Prison Officers' Union has maintained its affiliation. As of 2020, it has about 1,354 members. It is the largest union representing staff of the Ministry of Justice, and describes itself as the second-oldest affiliate of the SAK.
