= Wood and Allied Workers' Union =

Trade union of Finland

Wood Union
- Puuliitto
- Merged into: Metalworkers' Union; Industrial Union TEAM
- Successor: Industrial Union
- Formation: 1993
- Dissolved: 2017
- Merger of: Wood Workers' Union; Rural Workers' Union
- Type: Trade union
- Headquarters: Helsinki
- Publication: Särmä
- Formerly called: Puu- ja erityisalojen liitto, 'Wood and Allied Workers' Union' (until 2014)

The Wood and Allied Workers' Union (Finnish: Puu- ja erityisalojen liitto, PEL) was a trade union representing workers in the wood industry in Finland.

The union was founded in 1993, when the Wood Workers' Union merged with the Rural Workers' Union. Like its predecessors, the union affiliated to the Central Organisation of Finnish Trade Unions. By 1998, it had 51,455 members. In 2014, the union shortened its name, to become the Wood Union.

In 2017, the union merged with the Metalworkers' Union and the Industrial Union TEAM, to form the Industrial Union.

== Presidents ==
1993: Heikki Peltonen
1997: Kalevi Vanhala
2009: Sakari Lepola
2014: Jari Nilosaari
