= Industrial Union (Finland) =

Finnish trade union

- Teollisuusliitto
- Formation: 2017; 9 years ago
- Founder: Metalworkers' Union, Industrial Union TEAM & the Wood and Allied Workers' Union
- Type: Trade union
- Headquarters: Helsinki
- President: Riku Aalto
- Publication: Tekijä

The Industrial Union (Finnish: Teollisuusliitto) is a trade union representing workers in light and heavy industries in Finland.

The union was founded on 1 January 2018, when the Industrial Union TEAM merged with the Metalworkers' Union and the Wood and Allied Workers' Union. Like its predecessors, it affiliated to the Central Organisation of Finnish Trade Unions. From its formation, it has been led by Riku Aalto, who was formerly president of the Metalworkers' Union.

The Paperworkers' Union chose not to become part of the merger which formed the Industrial Federation, but Industrial Federation representatives stated that they hoped it would join within a few years.

The union is affiliated to four global union federations: IndustriALL Global Union, the Building and Wood Workers' International, the International Union of Food, Agricultural, Hotel, Restaurant, Catering, Tobacco and Allied Workers' Associations, and the UNI Global Union.
