= Post and Logistics Union =

Trade union of Finland

- Posti- ja logistiikka-alan unioni
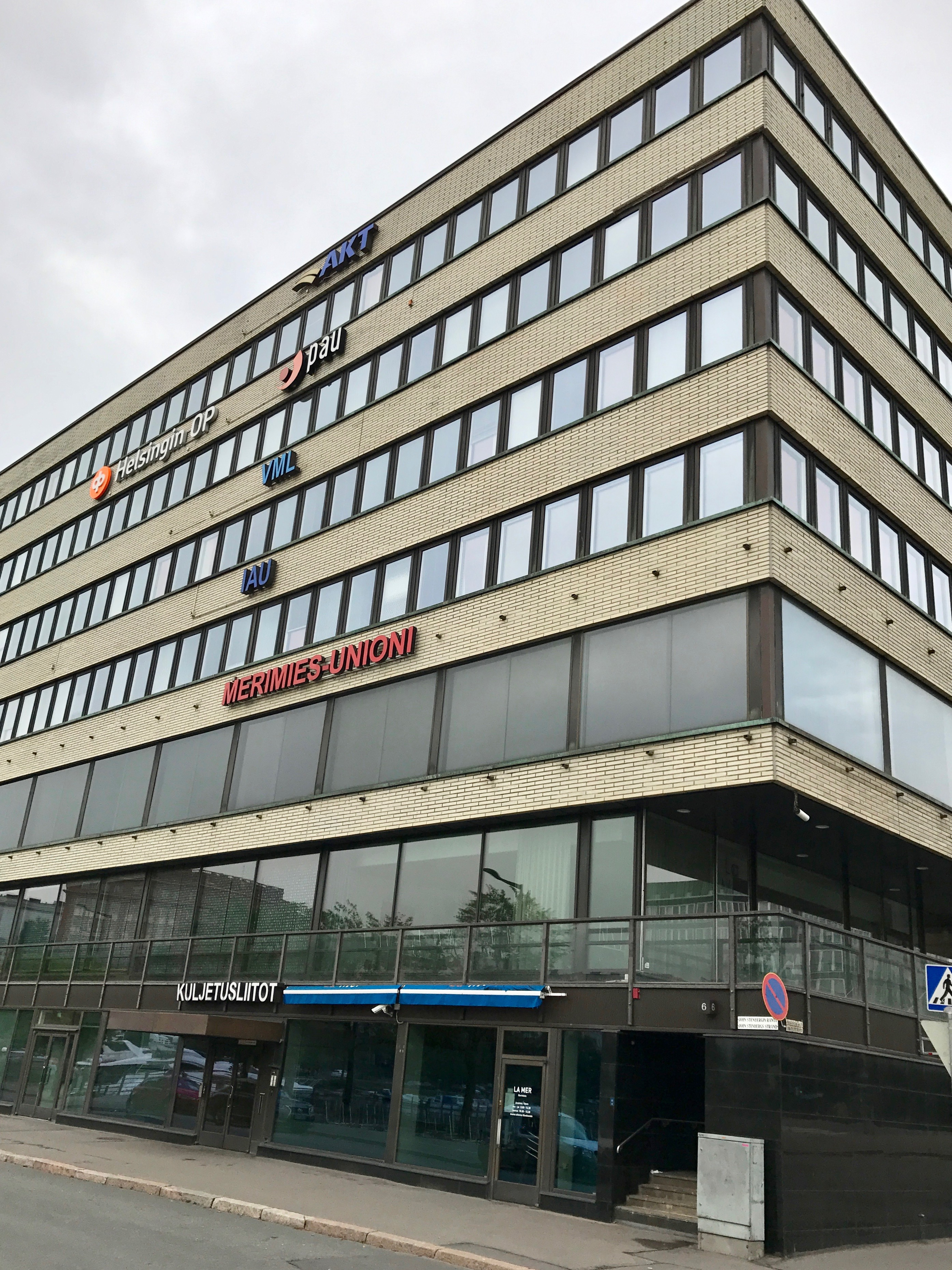
- Offices in Hakaniemi, Helsinki
- Founded: 1 June 2005
- Location: Finland
- Affiliations: Central Organisation of Finnish Trade Unions
- Website: www.pau.fi/en

The Post and Logistics Union (Finnish: Posti- ja logistiikka-alan unioni, PAU) is a trade union, principally representing postal workers, in Finland.

The union was founded on 1 June 2005, when the Postal Union merged with the Postal Officers' Union. The two unions, originally representing separate groups of workers, and affiliated to different union federations, had increasingly come to co-operate. The new union chose to affiliate to the Central Organisation of Finnish Trade Unions.

By 2007, the union represented 82% of eligible workers in the postal service, with approximately half the members being women. As of 2020, the union had 25,004 members.

== Presidents ==
- 2005: Esa Vilkuna
- 2014: Heidi Nieminen
