= Union of Locomotive Drivers =

Trade union of Finland

The Union of Locomotive Drivers (Finnish: Veturimiesten liitto, VML) was a trade union representing train drivers in Finland.

The union was founded in 1897 as the Finnish Drivers' and Stokers' Union, by drivers based in Lahti, Riihimäki, Hyvinkää, Hankoniemi, Helsinki, Toijala, Turku and Vyborg. The union affiliated to the Finnish Federation of Trade Unions (SAK) in 1943, and after the war also became a founding constituent of the Federation of Civil Servants (VY). It resigned from the SAK in 1960, disillusioned by its communist leadership.

In 1969, the VY was reformed as the Joint Organisation of State Employees (VTY), and through it, the VML joined the SAK's successor, the Central Organisation of Finnish Trade Unions. The VTY declined in size as the Finnish government put through a programme of privatisation, and in 1995, the VML resigned from it, disillusioned by its reduced influence. The VML instead affiliated directly to the SAK.

In 2018, the VML merged with the Railway Officers' Union, to form the Railway Union.

== Presidents ==
1920: Heikki A. Pyhäluoto
1943: Kauko A. Lehtonen
1951: Gösta Widing
1965: Pekka Oivio
1974: Lasse Syrjänen
1984: Heikki Nurmi
1993: Markku Hannola
2001: Risto Elonen
2017: Tero Palomäki
