= Railway Union =

Trade union in Finland

The Railway Union (Finnish: Rautatiealan Unioni, RAU) is a trade union representing drivers, traffic controllers and office staff on the railways in Finland.

The union was founded on 16 November 2018, when the Union of Locomotive Drivers merged with the Railway Officers' Union. Like its predecessors, the union affiliated to the Central Organisation of Finnish Trade Unions. The union has about 4,000 members, but about 50% are retired. The union's president is Tero Palomäki.
