= Textile and Knitting Workers' Union =

Trade union of Finland

The Textile and Knitting Workers' Union (Finnish: Kutoma- ja Neuletyöväen Liito, KNL) was a trade union representing workers in the textile industry in Finland.

The union was founded in 1952, when the Weaving Industry Union merged with a smaller union. Like its predecessors, it affiliated to the Finnish Federation of Trade Unions (SAK), but in 1960 became a founding affiliate of the Finnish Trade Union Federation (SAJ) split. This led its membership to decline, from more than 10,000, to just 5,851 by 1969.

In 1969, the SAK and the SAJ merged to form the Central Organisation of Finnish Trade Unions. In response, the following year, the Textile and Knitting Workers' Union merged with the Textile Workers' Union, and the Union of Clothing Workers, to form the Textile and Clothing Workers' Union.
