= Rubber and Leather Workers' Union =

Trade union of Finland

The Rubber and Leather Workers' Union (Finnish: Kumi- ja Nahkatyöväen Liitto, KJNL) was a trade union representing workers in the leather and rubber industries, including shoemakers, in Finland.

The union was founded in 1930 as the Leather, Footwear and Rubber Workers' Union, replacing the Finnish Leather and Rubber Workers' Union, which had been banned. The union affiliated to the Finnish Federation of Trade Unions, and from 1969 to its successor, the Central Organisation of Finnish Trade Unions.

From 1956, until the late 1970s, the union was led by Väinö Huhtamäki, and was associated with the left wing of the union movement. Huhtamäki himself was the only union leader to support the Communist Party of Finland. Its membership peaked at 15,900 in 1983, but by 1992, had fallen to 9,970. The following year, it merged with the Chemical Workers' Union, to form the Chemical Union.
