= Hotel and Restaurant Workers' Union (Finland) =

Trade union representing hospitality workers in Finland

The Hotel and Restaurant Workers' Union (Finnish: Hotelli- ja Ravintolahenkilökunnan Liitto, HRHL) was a trade union representing hospitality workers in Finland.

The union was founded on 14 November 1933, and affiliated to the Finnish Federation of Trade Unions, and then its successor, the Central Organisation of Finnish Trade Unions. In 1960, it had only 4,493 members, but by 1998, this had grown to 48,565, of whom 84.3% were women.

In 2000, the union merged with the Technical and Special Trades Union, the Caretakers' Union, and the Business Union, to form the Service Union United.
