= Textile and Clothing Workers' Union =

Trade union of Finland

The Textile and Clothing Workers' Union (Finnish: Tekstiili- ja vaatetustyöväen liitto, Teva) was a trade union representing workers involved in making textiles in Finland.

== History ==
The union was founded in 1971, when the Textile Workers' Union merged with the Textile and Knitting Workers' Union and the Union of Clothing Workers. These unions had been members of separate federations, but they had all joined the Central Organisation of Finnish Trade Unions in 1969, prompting the merger.

The union's membership initially increased, peaking at 48,254 in 1980. Employment in the industry then declined rapidly, and despite the small Finnish Textile Mechanics' Union merged into Teva in 1989, by 1998, it had only 18,829 members. In 2004, it merged into the Chemical Union.

== Presidents ==
1970: Väinö Kujanpää
1974: Seppo Niemi
1986: Tuulikki Kannisto
1991: Pirkko Oksa
