= Minna Sirnö =

Finnish politician

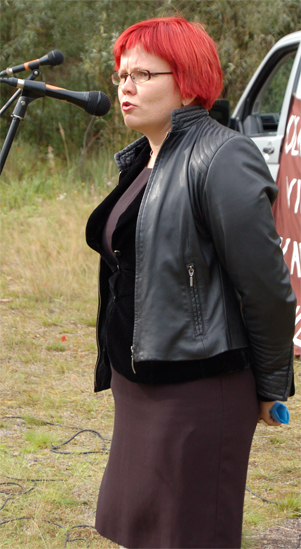
Minna Sirnö

Minna Maaria Sirnö (born 14 May 1966 in Tampere) is a Finnish politician and member of Finnish Parliament, representing the Left Alliance. She was elected to Finnish Parliament in 2003 in the district of Pirkanmaa. She lost her seat in 2011 elections.

Trade union offices
Preceded by Samppa Lahdenperä	President of the Theatre and Media Workers; 2003–2009	Succeeded by Reija Hirvikoski
