= Finnish Anarchist Association =

Trade union of Finland

- Suomen anarkistiliitto
- The Circle-A
- Founded: 1986
- Dissolved: 1999
- Location: Finland
- Members: 250 (1992)
- Publication: Vapaustaistelija
- Affiliations: IWA

The Finnish Anarchist Association (Finnish: Suomen anarkistiliitto, SAL) was an organization of Finnish anarchists that was founded in the second half of the 1980s and was active for about a decade. At the turn of the 1990s, the SAL was part of the International Workers' Association (IWA), an anarcho-syndicalist coalition that had existed since 1922. SAL was the first nationwide anarchist organization in Finland.

== History ==
The SAL was founded as the Finnish Anarcho-Syndicalist Association in 1986, later changing its name to the Finnish Anarchist Association in 1992. The operation started small-scale but rapidly expanded in the 1990s, beginning with the collapse of the USSR, when the AFP rose to prominence among the leftist youth of Finland. In addition to meetings, the SAL's activities at that time included pasting posters, organizing demonstrations and planning various campaigns.

At the beginning of the 1990s, in Helsinki and Kuopio, the SAL competed with the Anarkistinen maailma (AM) for members, with animal rights issues becoming a more central position. AM's key players have since set up the Justice for Animals Association (Finnish: Oikeutta eläimille, OE), to which SAL activists also transferred. From 1992, the SAL's members were involved in founding Antifascist groups around Finland. In 1994, mutual disputes paralyzed the growth of the organization. These disputes began when police arrested members of the "Shoot Esko Aho" poster campaign and then they were extended to forms of association and the separation of one of the members.

A federal program was approved by the SAL in the winter of 1997–1998, but the union's activities were already waning at that time, and the program did not have much time to make a difference in practice. The last national meeting of the SAL was held in September 1997 in Jyväskylä. The remaining membership fees were used, among other things, for organizing a counter-protest against the EU summit in Tampere in the autumn of 1999. As the SAL waned, in addition to OE, its members moved to the syndicalist Solidarity, the Peppi Anarcho-Feminist Alliance, the Black Rainbow, and Food Not Bombs groups, among others. At the end of the 1990s, Solidarity was attended by some 70 people, many of whom were anarchists.

== Organization ==
The SAL was based on local departments and had no separate central bodies. The joint decisions were made twice a year in general meetings, at which all members voted. In 1992, the SAL had local departments in Helsinki, Tampere, Oulu and Kemi. Subsequently, others were established in Hämeenlinna, Jyväskylä, Järvenpäähän, Rovaniemi, Tornio and Varkaus.

The membership of the SAL peaked in 1992, when about 250 people paid membership fees. However, as early as the following year, the number of paying members dropped to sixty, then stabilizing at around 100, until the practice virtually ceased in the late 1990s.

== Publications ==
The SAL's newsletter was the monthly Freedom Fighter, which informed members about upcoming events, among other things. The last issue of the Freedom Fighter appeared in 1999. Members of the SAL were also strongly involved in the editorial work of the Rebel Worker, which started publication in 1989. However, the Rebel Worker was not a SAL magazine, and has continued to appear after SAL ceased activities in 1999.

In 1996, the SAL published Rudolf Rocker's book Anarcho-syndicalism into Finnish. In the preface to the book, Rocker was called "the chief theorist of anarchosyndicalism."
