= Trade Union for Theatre and Media =

Trade union of Finland

- Teatteri- ja mediatyöntekijöiden liitto Fackförbundet för teater och media Finland
- Abbreviation: Teme
- Predecessor: Finnish Union of Film and Video Workers
- Established: November 12, 1973; 52 years ago
- Merger of: Finnish Theatre Directors' Union, Finnish Union of Set Designers, Finland Theatre Teachers' Federation, & Finnish Union of Technical Theatre
- Type: Trade union
- Headquarters: Helsinki
- Location: Finland
- Fields: Theatre and Media
- Members: 5,020 (2020)
- Official languages: Finnish, Swedish
- Affiliations: SAK
- Website: teme.fi
- Formerly called: Finnish Theatre Workers' Union (1973-98), Theatre and Media Workers (1998-2013)

The Trade Union for Theatre and Media (Finnish: Teatteri- ja mediatyöntekijöiden liitto, Teme, Swedish: Fackförbundet för teater och media Finland) is a trade union representing workers in theatre, dance, film, and television production, in Finland.

== History ==
The union was founded on 12 November 1973, when the Finnish Theatre Directors' Union, the Finnish Union of Set Designers, the Finland Theatre Teachers' Federation and the Finnish Union of Technical Theatre merged, to form the Finnish Theatre Workers' Union. In 1988, the Finnish Union of Film and Video Workers also joined.

In 1998, the union changed its name to Theatre and Media Workers, and it adopted its current name in 2013. In 2007, the union affiliated to the Central Organisation of Finnish Trade Unions.

As of 2020, the union has about 5,020 members, each of whom is a member of one of seven affiliated sections:

- Theatre, Film and Television Designers
- Union of Dance and Circus Artists Finland
- Union of Film and Media Employees Finland
- Lighting, Sound and Video Designers in Finland
- Union of Theatre Directors and Dramaturges Finland
- Theatre Professionals' Union Finland
- Association of Cinema Projectionists Finland

== Presidents ==
1973: Paul Suominen
1976: Raija-Sinikka Rantala
1977: Heikki Mäkelä
1983: Liisi Tandefelt
1985: Ossi Räikkä
1987: Veli-Pekka Niiranen
1991: Antti Einari Halonen
1993: Kaija Siikala
1995: Samppa Lahdenperä
2003: Minna Sirnö
2009: Reija Hirvikoski
2016: Kalle Ropponen
2019: Atro Kahiluoto
