= Postal Officers' Union =

Trade union of Finland

The Postal Officers' Union (Finnish: Postin Toimihenkilöliitto, PVL) was a trade union representing postal service workers in Finland.

The union was founded in 1894 in Helsinki, as the Finnish Postal Union. It did not represent all workers in the postal service, but only officers whose jobs required them to undertake specific training and demonstrate their language skills; other workers joined the Postal Union.

For many years, the union was affiliated to the Finnish Confederation of Professionals (STTK). By 2000, the distinction between officers and other workers no longer existed, and the union began collaborating more closely with the Postal Union. In order to facilitate a merger, in 2003 it resigned from the STTK and joined the Central Organisation of Finnish Trade Unions. By this point, the union had around 5,000 members.

In 2005, the union merged with the Postal Union, to form the Post and Logistics Union.
