= Technical and Special Trades Union =

Trade union of Finland

The Technical and Special Trades Union (Finnish: Teknisten ja Erikoisammattien Liitto, Tekeri) was a trade union representing private sector workers in Finland.

The union was founded in 1970 from a merger of smaller unions. It affiliated to the Central Organisation of Finnish Trade Unions (SAK), and was given jurisdiction over all private sector workers not included in another union. This included broadcasting staff, consultants, graphic designers, and pop musicians. By 1998, the union had 10,701 members.

In 2000, the union merged with the Business Union, the Caretakers' Union, and the Hotel and Restaurant Workers' Union, to form the Service Union United.
