= Caretakers' Union =

Finnish trade union representing janitors

The Caretakers' Union (Finnish: Kiinteistötyöntekijäin Liitto, KL or KTTL) was a trade union representing janitors in Finland.

The union was founded in 1948 and affiliated to the Finnish Federation of Trade Unions, and from 1969, to its successor, the Central Organisation of Finnish Trade Unions. It had only 2,228 members in 1955, but by 1998, this had grown to 13,881. In 2000, it merged with the Business Union, the Technical and Special Trades Union, and the Hotel and Restaurant Workers' Union, to form the Service Union United.
