= Service Union United =

Finnish trade union

- Palvelualojen ammattiliitto PAM
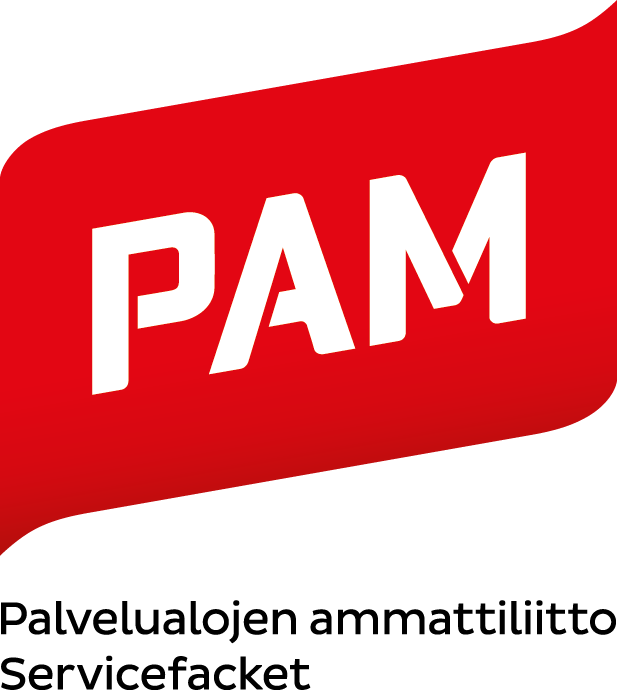
- Formation: 28 November 2000; 25 years ago
- Type: Trade union
- Headquarters: Helsinki
- President: Annika Rönni-Sällinen

The Service Union United (Finnish: Palvelualojen ammattiliitto, PAM; Swedish: Servicefacket) is a trade union representing service sector workers in Finland.

The union was founded in 2000, when the Business Union merged with the Caretakers' Union, the Hotel and Restaurant Workers' Union, and the Technical and Special Trades Union. Like its predecessor, the union affiliated to the Central Organisation of Finnish Trade Unions. PAM has agreed a total of 33 collective agreements as of the end of 2022.

As of 2023, the union had about 190,000 members.

== Presidents ==
2000: Maj-Len Remahl
2002: Ann Selin
2019: Annika Rönni-Sällinen
