= Finnish Business People's Union =

Trade union of Finland

The Finnish Business People's Union (Finnish: Suomen Liikeväen liitto, SLL) was a trade union representing clerical workers in Finland.

The union was founded in 1906, and in 1944 it became a founding affiliate of the Confederation of Salaried Employees. By 1986, it had 18.446 members.

In 1987, the union merged with the Commercial Workers' Union, and the Trade and Industry Officials' Union, to form the Business Union.
