= Trade Union for the Public and Welfare Sectors =

Trade union of Finland

- Julkisten ja hyvinvointialojen liitto
- Abbreviation: JHL
- Formation: 2006; 20 years ago
- Type: Trade union
- Headquarters: Helsinki
- President: Håkan Ekström
- Publication: Motiivi

The Trade Union for the Public and Welfare Sectors (Finnish: Julkisten ja hyvinvointialojen liitto, JHL) is a trade union representing workers in the public sector and welfare services, in Finland.

The union was founded on 22 November 2005, with the merger of three unions:

- Municipal Workers' Union
- Joint Organisation of State Employees
- State and Special Employees' Union

Three other unions, which had been affiliated to the Joint Organisations of State Employees, transferred to the JHL, while maintaining separate identities:

- Coastguard Union
- Finnish Custom Officers' Union
- Prison Officers' Union

All the unions were affiliated to the Central Organisation of Finnish Trade Unions, and the JHL also affiliated. With 230,000 members, it was the biggest union in Finland. In 2008, the Non-Commissioned Officers' Union merged into the JHL, while the Railway Workers' Union joined at the start of 2012.

== Presidents ==
2006: Tuire Santamäki-Vuori
2011: Jarkko Eloranta
2016: Päivi Niemi-Laine
2023: Håkan Ekström
