= Onni Närvänen =

Finnish trade union leader and politician (1909–1995)

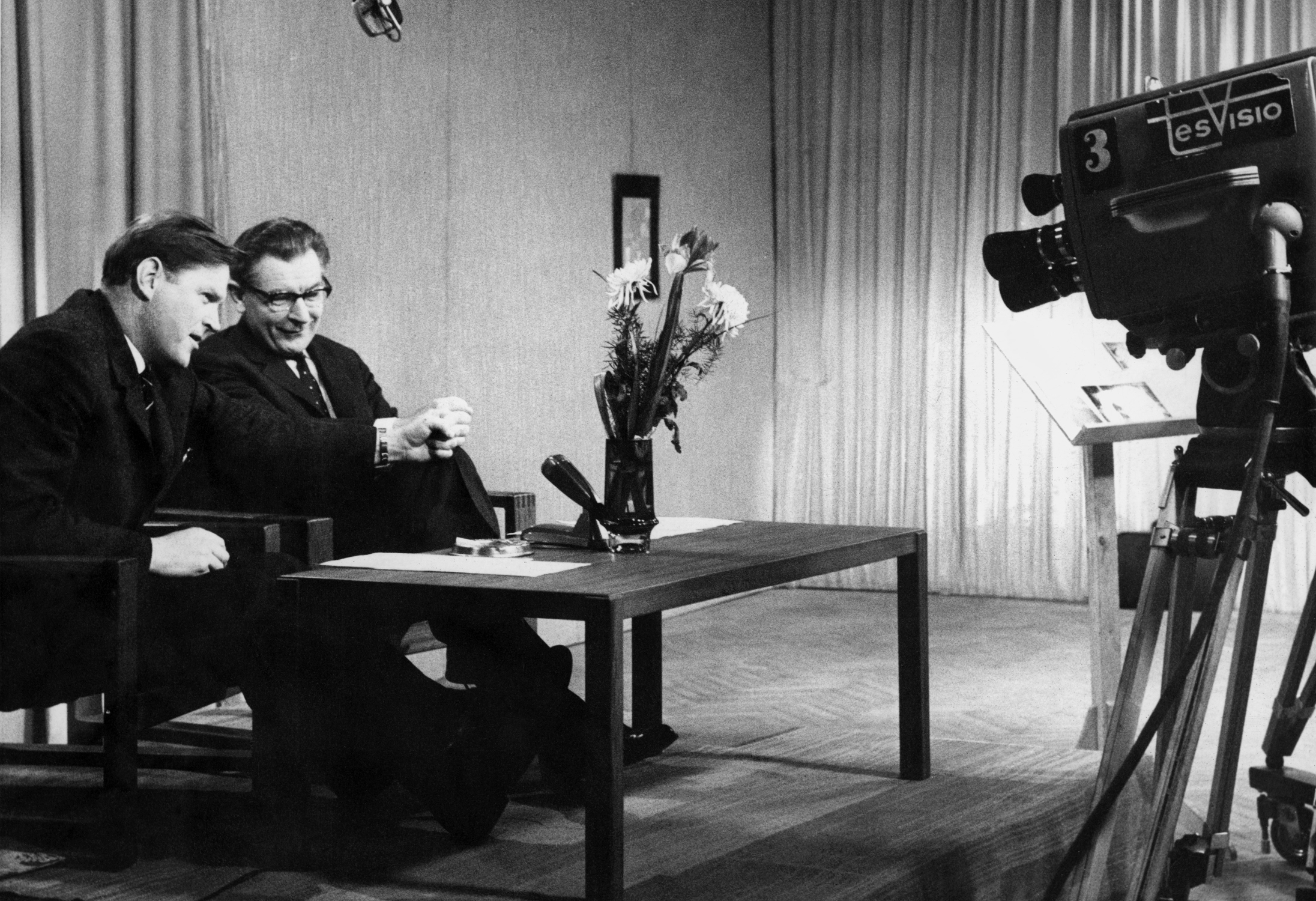
Eino S. Repo interviews Närvänen in 1962

Onni Närvänen (21 April 1909 – 24 November 1995) was a Finnish trade union leader and politician, born in Muolaa. He was a member of the Social Democratic Union of Workers and Smallholders. He served as Deputy Minister of Transport and Public Works from 13 April 1962 to 18 October 1963. He was the president of the Metalworkers' Union from 1960 to 1967.
