= Alli Nissinen =

Finnish educator and politician (1866–1926)

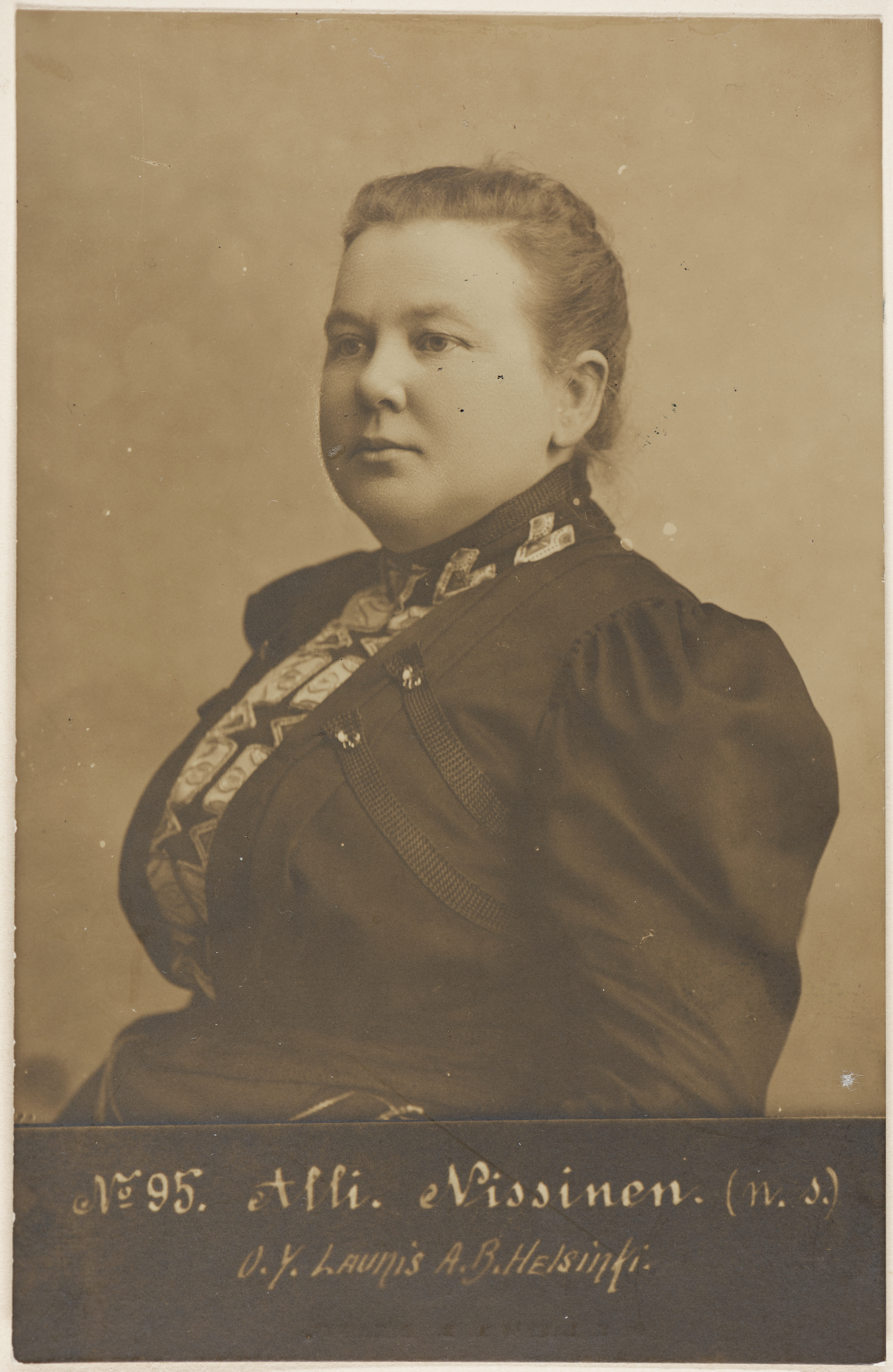

Member of Parliament
- In office 1907–1909
- Constituency: West Kuopio

Personal details
- Born: 26 December 1866; Iisalmi, Grand Duchy of Finland, Russian Empire
- Died: 11 April 1926 (aged 59); Helsinki, Finland
- Political party: Young Finnish Party

Alina Augusta Nissinen (26 December 1866 – 11 April 1926) was a Finnish educator and politician. A member of the Young Finnish Party, she was elected to Parliament in 1907 as one of the first group of female MPs. She remained an MP until 1909.

== Biography ==
Nissinen was born in Iisalmi in 1866. After attending a girls' school, she trained to be a teacher. She taught geography and religion at the Helsingin Suomalainen Yhteiskoulu between 1889 and 1899, and the Helsingin Uusi yhteiskoulu from 1898 until 1916. She also ran her own Alli Nissinen School of Preparation between 1889 and her death, and served as chair of the Teachers' Association.

She served as vice-president of the Naisasialiitto Unioni women's organisation and was chair of the Martha organisation. In 1903 became editor-in-chief of the organisation's Emänttä magazine, a role she held for the rest of her life. She also wrote several children's books, plays and poetry.

Nissinen contested the 1907 elections on the Young Finnish Party's list in West Kuopio and was one of 19 women elected to parliament. She was re-elected in 1908, serving until May 1909. During her time in parliament she sat on the Committee on Legal Affairs.

She died in Helsinki in 1926.
