= Finnish Social Democratic Journalists' Union =

Finnish trade union

- Suomen Sosialidemokraattinen Sanomalehtimiesliitto
- Abbreviation: SSSL
- Established: 1907; 119 years ago
- Founded at: Tampere
- Type: Trade union
- Location: Finland
- Origins: Social Democratic Party of Finland
- Fields: Journalism
- Members: 271 (2020)
- Official language: Finnish
- Key people: Kaapo Murros, Kullervo Manner
- Affiliations: SAK
- Website: sssl.fi

The Finnish Social Democratic Journalists' Union (Finnish: Suomen Sosialidemokraattinen Sanomalehtimiesliitto, SSSL) is a trade union representing journalists in Finland.

The union was founded in 1907 in Tampere, by journalists working for publications of the Social Democratic Party of Finland. Its first president was Kaapo Murros, and in 1911, he was succeeded by Kullervo Manner.

The union affiliated to the Finnish Trade Union Federation, then from 1931 to 1958 to the Finnish Federation of Trade Unions, to a new Finnish Trade Union Federation from 1960, and finally, since 1969, has been affiliated to the Central Organisation of Finnish Trade Unions.

The union celebrated its hundredth anniversary in 2007. It remains a small organisation, and as of 2020, had 271 members.
