= Valdemar Liljeström =

Finnish trade union activist and politician

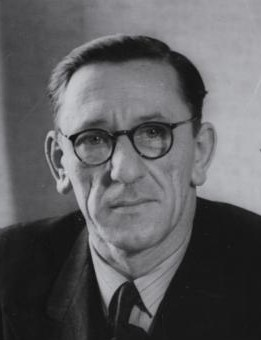
Valdemar Liljeström in 1950

Valdemar (Vladimir) Liljeström (26 February 1902 in Saint Petersburg – 11 November 1960, Geneve, Switzerland) was a Finnish trade union activist and politician. He was at first a member of the Social Democratic Party of Finland and, after 1959, of the Social Democratic Union of Workers and Smallholders. He served as the chairman of the Metalworkers' Union from 1947 until 1960, as Minister of Social Affairs in Karl-August Fagerholm's first cabinet (29 July 1948 - 4 March 1949), Deputy Minister of Public Works in Vieno Johannes Sukselainen's first cabinet (2 September 1957 - 28 November 1957), Minister of Social Affairs in Reino Kuuskoski's cabinet (26 April 1958 - 29 August 1958) and as a Member of Parliament (2 February 1955 - 11 November 1960).

Trade union offices
| Preceded by Yrjö Rantala | President of the Metalworkers' Union; 1947–1960 | Succeeded by Onni Närvänen |
