= Group B (disambiguation) =

Group B was a set of regulations introduced in 1982 for competition vehicles in sportscar racing.

Group B may also refer to:

== FIFA World Cup ==
- 2026 FIFA World Cup Group B, Canada, Bosnia and Herzegovina, Qatar, Switzerland
- 2022 FIFA World Cup Group B, England, Iran, United States, Wales
- 2018 FIFA World Cup Group B, Iran, Morocco, Portugal, Spain
- 2014 FIFA World Cup Group B, Australia, Chile, the Netherlands, Spain
- 2010 FIFA World Cup Group B, Argentina, Nigeria, South Korea, Greece
- 2006 FIFA World Cup Group B, England, Sweden, Paraguay, Trinidad & Tobago
- 2002 FIFA World Cup Group B, Spain, Paraguay, South Africa, Slovenia
- 1998 FIFA World Cup Group B, Italy, Chile, Austria, Cameroon
- 1994 FIFA World Cup Group B, Brazil, Russia, Cameroon, Sweden
- 1990 FIFA World Cup Group B, Cameroon, Romania, Argentina, Soviet Union

== Other uses ==
- Group B streptococcal infection or strep B
- Army Group B, three German Army Groups in World War II
- the group of industrialized countries ("The West") in UNCTAD
- Group B posts in the Civil Services of India
- GROUP B, a song by Tyler, the Creator
