= Sepänkylä =

Sepänkylä Smedsby
- District of Espoo
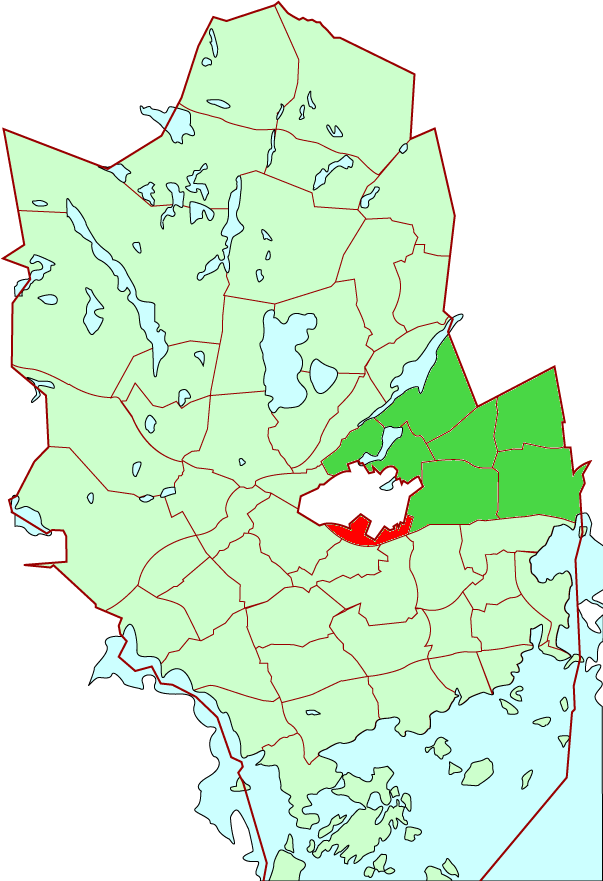
- Location of Sepänkylä within Espoo
- Coordinates: 60°12′15″N 24°44′0″E
- Country: Finland
- Municipality: Espoo
- Region: Uusimaa
- Sub-region: Greater Helsinki
- Main District: Suur-Leppävaara
- Inner District(s): Sepänkylä, Ymmersta

Population (2006)
  - Total: 2,977

Languages
  - Finnish: 73.2 %
  - Swedish: 20.1 %
  - Other: 6.8 %
- Jobs: 326

Sepänkylä (Finnish) or Smedsby (Swedish) is a district of Espoo, a city in Finland.

== See also ==
- Districts of Espoo
