= Business Union =

Trade union of Finland

The Business Union (Finnish: Liikealan ammattiliitto) was a trade union representing clerical workers in Finland.

The union was formed in 1987, when the Commercial Workers' Union, an affiliate of the Central Organisation of Finnish Trade Unions (SAK), merged with the Finnish Business People's Union, an affiliate of the Confederation of Salaried Employees, and the Trade and Industry Officials' Union. The new union decided to affiliate to the SAK, and it was led by Maj-Len Remahl, former president of the Commercial Workers' Union.

By 1998, the union had 128,286 members. In 2000, it merged with the Caretakers' Union, the Hotel and Restaurant Workers' Union, and the Technical and Special Trades Union, to form Service Union United.
