= Commercial Workers' Union =

Trade union of Finland

The Commercial Workers' Union (Finnish: Liiketyöntekijäin Liitto) was a trade union representing clerical workers in Finland.

The union was founded in 1917 as the Finnish Trade and Business Workers' Union, and it affiliated to the Finnish Trade Union Federation. The union grew steadily, and from 1930 was affiliated to the Finnish Federation of Trade Unions (SAK). It resigned from the SAK in 1961, becoming independent until 1969, when it joined the SAK's successor, the Central Organisation of Finnish Trade Unions.

In 1987, the union merged with the Finnish Business People's Union, an affiliate of the Confederation of Salaried Employees, and the Trade and Industry Officials' Union, to form the Business Union.

== Presidents ==
1917: Johan Emil Järvisalo
1920s:
1949: Aarre Happonen
1974: Kunto Kaski
1982: Kauko Suhonen
1986: Maj-Len Remahl
