= Metalworkers' Union =

Trade union of Finland

- Metallityöväen Liitto
- Nickname: Metalliliitto
- Formation: 1930
- Type: Trade union
- Headquarters: Helsinki
- President: Riku Aalto (last)
- Publication: Ahjo

The Metalworkers' Union (Finnish: Metallityöväen Liitto, Metalli) was a trade union representing workers in the metal industry in Finland.

The first Metalworkers' Union in Finland was founded in 1899, but was banned in 1930. Later that year, a new Metalworkers' Union was founded by the Social Democratic Party (SDP). The union affiliated to the Finnish Federation of Trade Unions (SAK). Unlike many unions, it remained with the SAK in 1960, when supporters of the SDP formed the Finnish Trade Union Federation (SAJ). Members of Metalli who wished to join the SAJ formed two new unions: the Steel, Mining and Machine Shop Union, and the Union of Industrial Workshop and Power Workers. In 1969, the SAK and the SAJ merged, to form the Central Organisation of Finnish Trade Unions. Metalli joined the new federation, and the two breakaway unions rejoined it.

The Finnish Mining Union merged into the Metalworkers' Union in 1969, followed in 1974 by the Precious Metal Workers' Union, and in 2003 by the Automobile and Machinery Union. By 1998, it had 166,854 members.

In 2009, the union was part of negotiations to form the Industrial Union TEAM. While a narrow majority of members voted in favour of a merger, this did not reach the required three-quarters majority, and so the union remained independent. In 2017, Metalli merged with TEAM and the Wood and Allied Workers' Union, to form the Industrial Union.

== Presidents ==
1940: Yrjö Rantala
1947: Valdemar Liljeström
1960: Onni Närvänen
1967: Sulo Penttilä
1983: Per-Erik Lundh
2000: Erkki Vuorenmaa
2008: Riku Aalto
