= Chemical Union =

Trade union of Finland

The Chemical Union (Finnish: Kemianliitto, Kemia) was a trade union representing workers in light industries in Finland.

The union was established in 1993, when the Chemical Workers' Union merged with the Rubber and Leather Workers' Union. The following year, the Finnish Glass and Porcelain Workers' Union also joined the new union, which, by 1998, had 34,944 members.

In 2004, the Textile and Clothing Workers' Union merged into the Chemical Union, raising its membership to about 50,000 workers. The union was keen to undertake further mergers, and began negotiations with six manufacturing unions, but the Metalworkers' Union withdrew, leading the talks to collapse. Only the Finnish Media Union remained interested in a merger, and in 2009, the Chemical Union merged with it, to form the Industrial Union TEAM.

== Presidents ==
1993: Heikki Pohja
1994: Hilkka Häkkilä
1996: Timo Vallunta
