= Central Organisation of Finnish Trade Unions =

SAK
- Central Organisation of Finnish Trade Unions
- Suomen Ammattiliittojen Keskusjärjestö (Finnish); Finlands Fackförbunds Centralorganisation (Swedish)
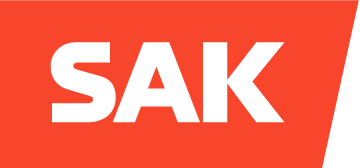
- Founded: 1969
- Headquarters: Helsinki, Finland
- Location: Finland
- Members: c. 1 million+
- Key people: Jarkko Eloranta, president
- Affiliations: ITUC, NFS, ETUC
- Website: www.sak.fi/en

The Central Organisation of Finnish Trade Unions, usually referred to by the acronym SAK (Finnish: Suomen Ammattiliittojen Keskusjärjestö; Swedish: Finlands Fackförbunds Centralorganisation, FFC) is the largest trade union confederation in Finland. Its member organisations have a total of more than one million members, which makes up about one fifth of the country's population.

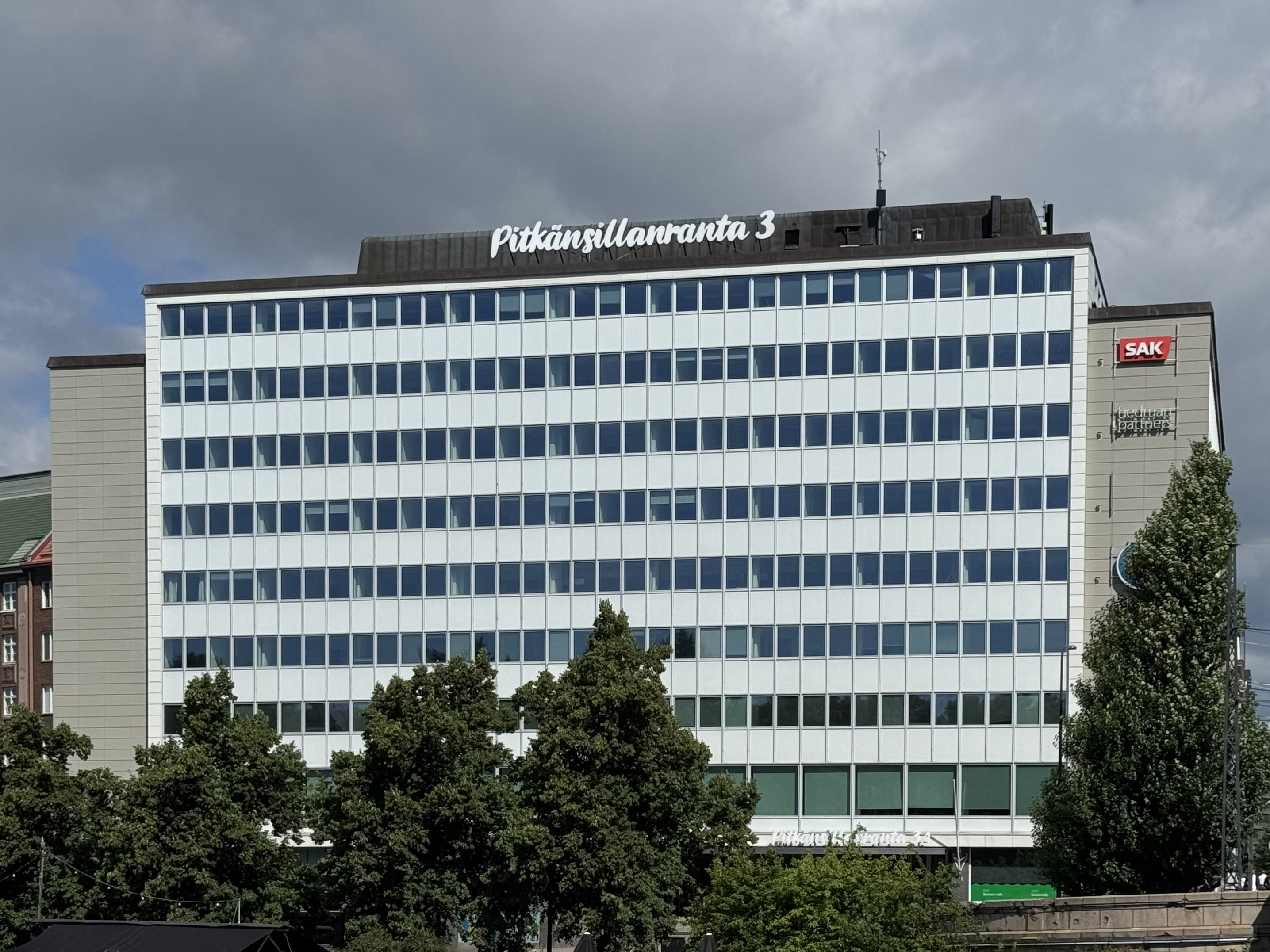
Headquarters of the Central Organisation of Finnish Trade Unions in Hakaniemi, Helsinki.

== History ==
The other two Finnish trade unions confederations are the Finnish Confederation of Professionals (STTK) and the Confederation of Unions for Professional and Managerial Staff in Finland (AKAVA). The most important negotiating partner of the SAK is the Confederation of Finnish Industries (EK, Elinkeinoelämän keskusliitto/Finlands Näringsliv) which represents the majority of Finnish employers.

The current SAK was founded in 1969 as the Finnish Federation of Trade Unions (SAK 1930–1969), controlled by SKDL and TPSL, and the Finnish Trade Union Federation (SAJ 1960–1969), controlled by the SDP, settled their disputes and merged into one. The SAK considers itself the continuation of the first Finnish central organisation, the Finnish Trade Union Federation (SAJ 1907–1930).

The SAK is generally supportive of the Social Democratic Party, and has spent money on advertisements backing the party. In 2007, advertisements it placed on behalf of the SDP were found to be defamitory, leading the SAK to withdraw them.

== Member unions ==
=== Current ===
Union	Abbreviation	Founded	Affiliated	Membership (2020)
Aviation Union	IAU	1969	1969	3,939
Non Commissioned Officers Union*	Aliupseeriliitto	1966		3,282
Border Security Union*	RTU	2010	2010	2,540
Construction Trade Union	Rakennusliitto	1924	1969	69,060
Customs Union*	Tulliliitto	1906		882
Finnish Electrical Workers' Union	Sähköliitto	1955	1969	34,663
Finnish Elite Athletes' Union	SHU	2002	2012	1,625
Finnish Food Workers' Union	SEL	1932	1969	30,047
Finnish Musicians' Union	Muusikkojenliitto	1917	1974	3,605
Finnish Seafarers' Union	SM-U	1916	1969	9,056
Finnish Social Democratic Journalists' Union	SSSL	1907	1969	271
Finnish Transport Workers' Union	AKT	1970	1970	43,509
General Union of Journalists	YLL	1947		173
Industrial Union	Teollisuusliitto	2018	2018	211,801
Paperworkers' Union	Paperiliitto	1906	1969	33,826
Post and Logistics Union	PAU	2005	2005	25,004
Prison Officers' Union*	VVL	1895	1969	1,354
Public and Welfare Services Union	JHL	2005	2005	181,881
Railway Union	RAU	2018	2018	3,853
Service Union United	PAM	2000	2000	207,334
Trade Union for Theatre and Media	TeMe	1973	2007	5,007
Union of Foremen in Commerce*	KEY			7,901

- Unions marked with "*" are affiliated to the SAK through another union, but their membership is counted separately.

=== Former ===
Union	Abbreviation	Founded	Affiliated	Reason not affiliated	Year
Air Transport Union		1957	1969	Merged into IAU	1969
Automobile and Machinery Union	AKU		?	Merged into Metalli	2003
Automobile and Transport Workers' Union		?	1969	Merged into AKT	1970
Business Union		1987	1987	Merged into PAM	2000
Caretakers' Union	KL	1948	1969	Merged into PAM	2000
Chemical Union	Kemia	1993	1993	Merged into TEAM	2009
Chemical Workers' Union	KTL	1970	1970	Merged into Kemia	1993
Commercial Workers' Union		1917	1969	Merged into Business Union	1987
Finnish Air Transport Union			1969	Merged into IAU	1969
Finnish Automobile Workers' Union		1960	1969	Merged into AKT	1970
Finnish Bricklayers' Union		1905	1969	Merged into Construction Trade Union	1971
Finnish Cabin Crew Union	SLSY		2002	Merged into AKT	2015
Finnish Divers' Union		1906	1969	Merged into Construction Trade Union	1969
Finnish Glass and Porcelain Workers' Union		1907	1969	Merged into Kemia	1994
Finnish Media Union	VA	1894	1969	Merged into TEAM	2009
Finnish Miners' Union			1969	Merged into Metalli	1969
Finnish Police Union	SPJL	1923	1969	Resigned	1984
Finnish Port Workers' Union			1969	Merged into AKT	1970
Finnish Ships' Officers' Union	SLPL	1905	1972	Transferred to STTK	1989
Finnish Textile Mechanics' Union			1969	Merged into Teva	1989
Finnish General Workers' Union		1930	1969	Merged into Kemia	1970
General and Speciality Workers' Union	YEA	1960	1969	Merged into Kemia and SEL	1970
Hotel and Restaurant Workers' Union	HRHL	1933	1969	Merged into PAM	2000
Industrial Union TEAM	TEAM	2010	2010	Merged into Industrial Union	2017
Joint Organisation of State Employees	VTY	1921	1969	Merged into JHL	2005
Journalist Union		1947	1969	?	?
Mental Health and Disability Union			1969	Merged into KTV	1981
Metalworkers' Union	Metalli	1930	1969	Merged into Industrial Union	2017
Municipal and Hospital Workers' Union		1963	1969	Merged into KTV	1971
Municipal Workers' Union	KTV	1931	1969	Merged into JHL	2005
Organisation of State Employees			1969	?	?
Postal Officers' Union		1894	2003	Merged into PAU	2005
Postal Union		1906	1969	Merged into PAU	2005
Precious Metal Workers' Union		1906	1969	Merged into Metalli	1974
Railway Salaried Staff's Union				Merged into RAU	2018
Railway Workers' Union	RAUTL	1930	1996	Merged into JHL	2011
Rubber and Leather Workers' Union	KNL	1930	1969	Merged into Kemia	1993
Rural Workers' Union	SML	1945	1969	Merged into PEL	1993
Technical and Special Trades Union	Tekeri	1970	1970	Merged into PAM	2000
Textile and Clothing Workers' Union	Teva	1971	1971	Merged into Kemia	2004
Textile Workers' Union		1960	1969	Merged into Teva	1970
Union of Locomotive Drivers	VML	1897	1995	Merged into RAU	2018
Union of Organising Officers	JTL				1996
Wood and Allied Workers' Union	PEL	1993	1993	Merged into Industrial Union	2017
Wood Workers' Federation	PTTL	1960	1969	Merged into SPL	1973
Wood Workers' Union	SPL	1930	1969	Merged into PEL	1993

== Presidents ==
1969: Niilo Hämäläinen
1974: Pekka Oivio
1981: Pertti Viinanen
1990: Lauri Ihalainen
2009: Lauri Lyly
2016: Jarkko Eloranta
