= Niilo Wälläri =

Finnish politician (1897–1967)

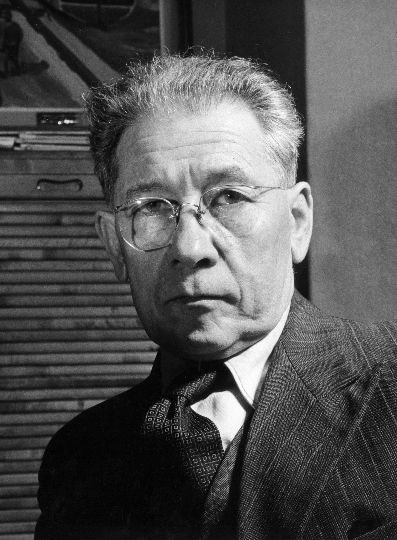
Wälläri in 1955

Niilo Frans Wälläri (1897–1967) was a Finnish trade unionist and politician. He led the Finnish Seamen's Union from 1938 through his death.

== Bibliography ==
- Bergholm, Tapio (2009). "Transforming foreign policy the boycott of South African trade by the Finnish Transport Workers' Union 1985–1992". South African Journal of Economic History. 24 (1): 1–29. doi:10.1080/10113430909511212.
- Heino, Timo-Erkki (1992). Politics on Paper: Finland's South Africa Policy, 1945-1991. Nordic Africa Institute. ISBN 91-7106-326-9.
- Hodgson, John H. (1973). "Finnish communists and the "opportunism of conciliation"". Studies in Comparative Communism. 6 (4): 397–404. JSTOR 45366708.
- Koponen, Juhani; Heinonen, Hannu (2002). "Africa in Finnish policy – deepening involvement". In Wohlgemuth, Lennart (ed.). The Nordic Countries and Africa – Old and New Relations. Nordic Africa Institute. ISBN 91-7106-505-9.
- Pinta, Saku (2012). "Educate, Organize, Emancipate: The Work People's College and The Industrial Workers of the World". In Haworth, Robert H. (ed.). Anarchist Pedagogies: Collective Actions, Theories, and Critical Reflections on Education. PM Press. ISBN 978-1-60486-484-7.
- Saarela, Tauno (2011). "American impact on Finnish communism in the 1920s". In Beaulieu, Michel S.; Harpelle, Ronald N.; Penney, Jaimi (eds.). Labouring Finns: Transnational Politics in Finland, Canada and the United States. Institute of Migration. ISBN 978-952-5889-22-2.
- Säve-Söderberg, Bengt; Peltola, Pekka (2014). "The Scandinavian anti-apartheid movement: international solidarity in action". In Ngcaweni, Busani (ed.). The Future We Chose: Emerging Perspectives on the Centenary of the ANC. African Books Collective. pp. 154–167. ISBN 978-0798304375.
- Sellström, Tor (2024). "Sweden and the Nordic countries: Official solidarity and assistance from the West". The Road to Democracy in South Africa. Routledge. doi:10.4324/9781003587026-6. ISBN 9781003587026.
- Soiri, Iina; Peltola, Pekka (1999). Finland and National Liberation in Southern Africa. Nordic Africa Institute. ISBN 91-7106-431-1.
- Wyman, Mark (2001). "Return migration - old story, new story". Immigrants & Minorities. 20 (1): 1–18. doi:10.1080/02619288.2001.9975006.
