= Oikeutta eläimille =

Finnish animal rights organisation

Justice for Animals
- Oikeutta eläimille
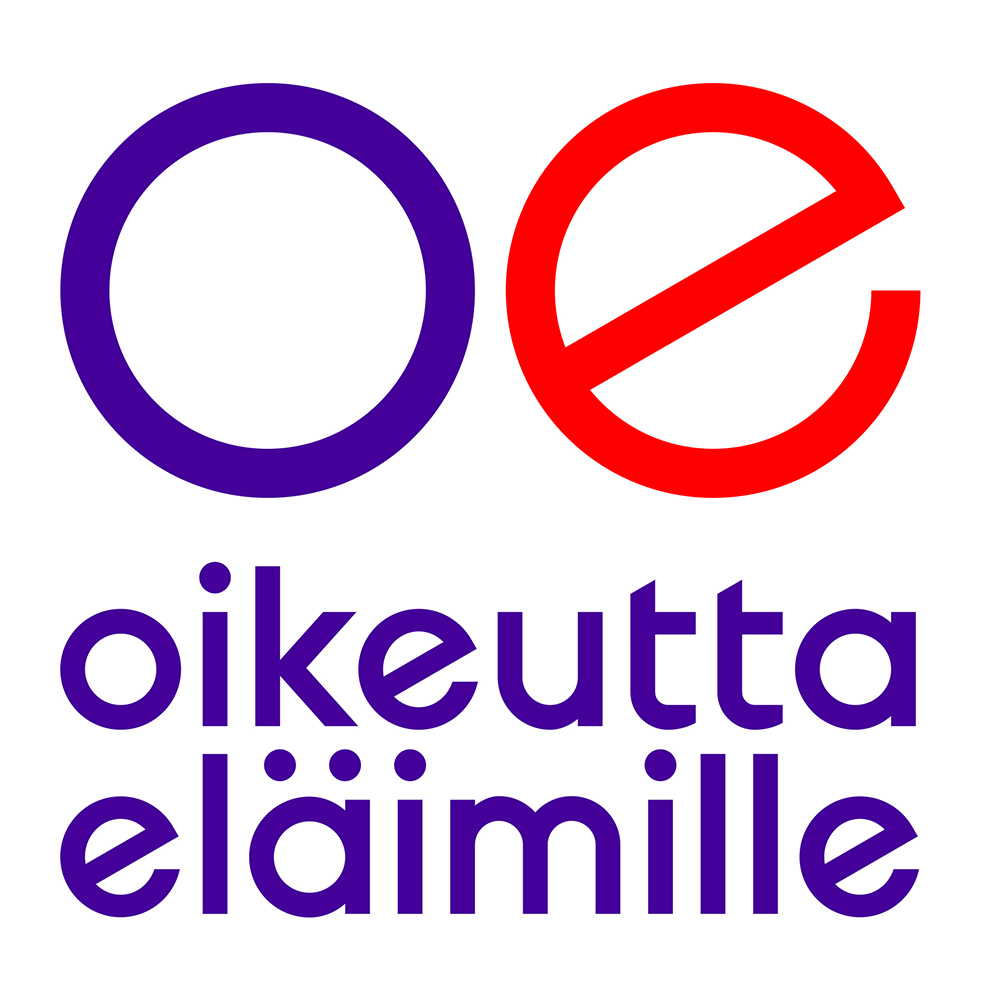
- Formation: 1995
- Type: Animal rights organization
- Headquarters: Finland
- Methods: Lecturing, demonstrations, distributing flyers, grassroots activism, civil disobedience, undercover investigations

Oikeutta eläimille ("Justice for Animals") is a Finnish animal rights organisation. Founded in 1995, the group engages in lecturing, demonstrations, distributing flyers and other grassroots activism, as well as civil disobedience. In recent years, the organisation has published photographs and videos from undercover investigations of Finnish pig, poultry and fur farms. The images have been widely circulated in the Finnish media, sparking public outrage and calls for the resignation of the Minister of Agriculture, Sirkka-Liisa Anttila. Oikeutta eläimille has also reported several fur farms to the police, and urged Finland to follow the example of fellow Nordic countries Denmark and Sweden and ban fur farming.

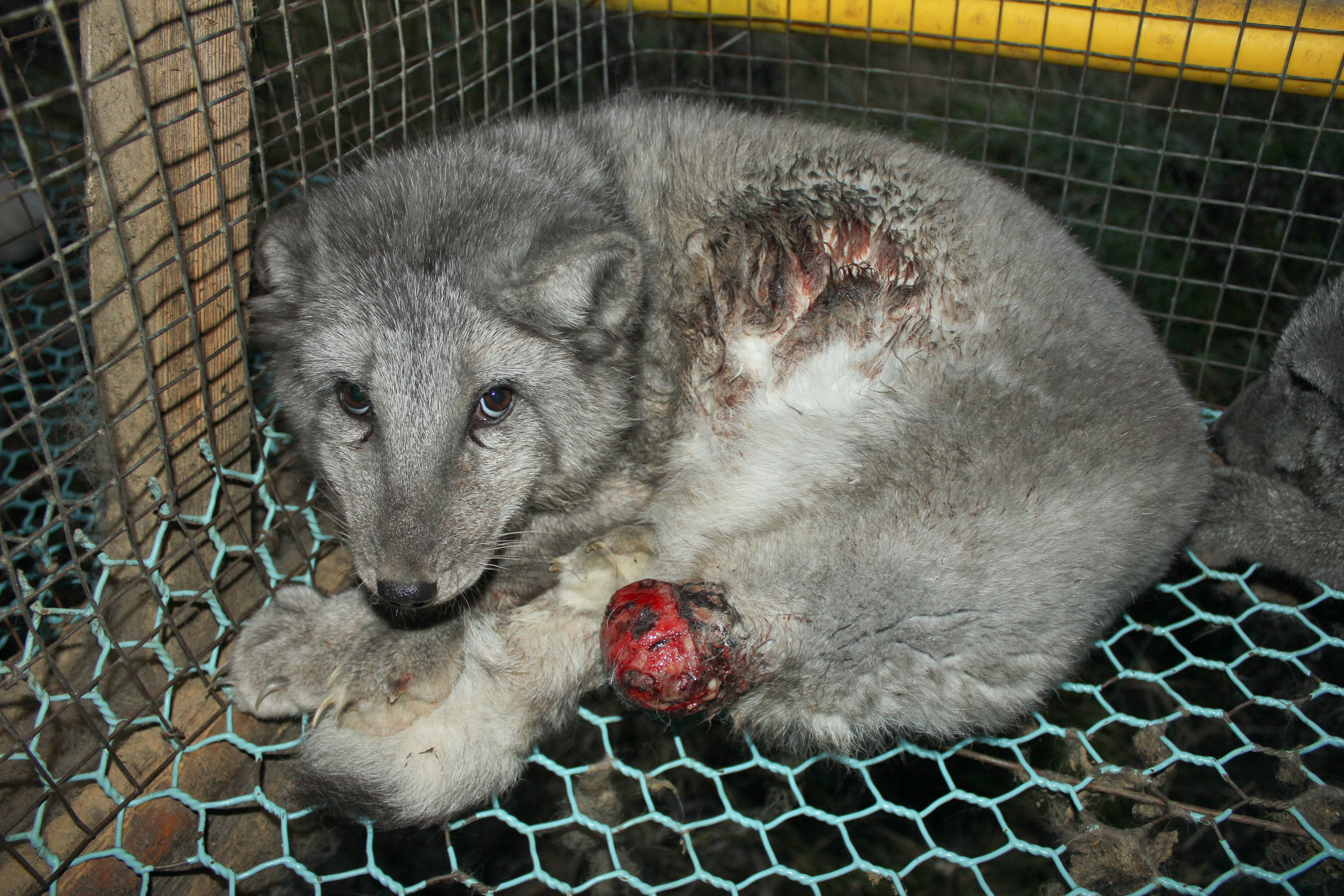
One of several photographs Oikeutta eläimille published in February 2011
