= General union =

All-sector bargaining entity

A general union is a trade union (called labor union in American English) which represents workers from all industries and companies, rather than just one organisation or a particular sector, as in a craft union or industrial union. A general union differs from a union federation or trades council in that its members are individuals, not unions. The creation of general unions, from the early nineteenth century in the United Kingdom and somewhat later elsewhere, occurred around the same time as efforts began to unionise workers in new industries, in particular those where employment could be irregular.

Proponents of general unions claim that their broader range of members allows more opportunities for solidarity action and better coordination in general strikes and the like. Detractors claim that the broader remit means they tend to be more bureaucratic and respond less effectively to events in a single industry.

In the United Kingdom, general unions include the GMB and the Transport and General Workers' Union. In Australia a good example of a general union is the Australian Workers' Union.

== See also ==
- One Big Union (concept)
