= Kaapo Murros =

Finnish journalist and politician

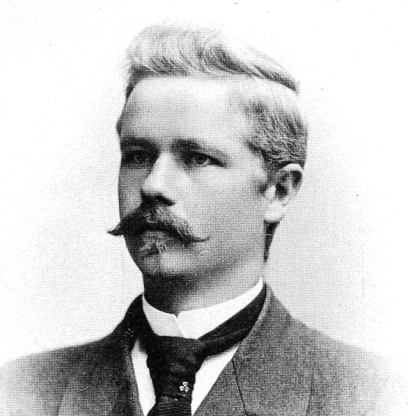
Photograph of the Finnish writer and journalist Kaapo Murros (1875–1951)

Kaapo Taavetti Murros (29 July 1875 – 17 March 1951; name until 1895 Gabriel David Ahlqvist) was a Finnish journalist, lawyer, writer, and politician. He was a member of the Parliament of Finland from 1910 to 1913, representing the Social Democratic Party of Finland (SDP).

Murros was born in Tampere. In 1902, he had to leave Finland after he had protested against illegal conscription. He emigrated to the United States, and he returned to Finland in 1906.
