= Group A (Finland) =

Anti-authoritarian political group

- Group A
- A-ryhmä
- Formation: 2006; 20 years ago
- Key people: Antti Rautiainen, Suvi Auvinen
- Main organ: Sytyke
- Affiliations: The Platform
- Website: a-ryhma.org

Group A (Finnish: A-ryhmä) is an anti-authoritarian political group based in Helsinki that organizes demonstrations and political campaigns, among other things. It is part of the Platform, a national anarchist organization in Finland, of which it was a founding member. The "task force" was set up over social media in 2006.

The group has organized lectures, demonstrations and political campaigns, aiming to make anarchist action easily approachable. It also offers food in a folk kitchen and publishes a magazine called Igniter. The group has operated on the premises of the Student Union of the University of Helsinki. Many of its members are also students at the University of Helsinki.

Well-known people who have worked in Group A include Antti Rautiainen and Suvi Auvinen.

== Ideas and values ==
Group A saw in 2014 that the state was waging a class war for the rich. The group holds that Finland's national unity is an illusion and that Finnishness corresponded only to the values of the white middle class. The group saw the activities of the Confederation of Finnish Industries as declaring strikes effectively illegal, the purpose of which was to guarantee the property of the owning class at the expense of others. In place of the capitalist system, Group A strives for the implementation of direct democracy in Finland.

== Demonstrations and political activity ==
=== Labor movement support activities ===
Group A has organized and participated in the May Day marches for several years, demonstrating against a hierarchical class society. In 2014, police destroyed Group A anarchist flags at the demonstration in Vappu, claiming they were being used as weapons. The incident caused a stir in the media, as police had also destroyed the red flags of the Left Youth.

In 2015, Group A supported a trade union's strike action by stopping a bus transport for strike breakers. As part of a major demonstration against government blackmail, trade unions had cut off the Helsinki Metro. Police action against Group A protesters was violent, with the police strangling the protesters. But the police denied these allegations.

=== Antifascism ===
In addition to the Crow Network, Group A was a supporter of the Helsinki Without Nazis demonstrations. The 2018 procession, which gathered 2,000 to 3,000 participants, flew red-black anarchist flags at the head of the demonstration. Group A also donated a white sheet to Olli Immonen, who was temporarily suspended from Finns Party because of racism, in a reference to the costume of the Ku Klux Klan.

=== Action against cuts and poverty ===
In a protest against pension cuts, in 2015, there was an anarchist bloc organized by Group A. In 2014, the group took part in a "Class Trip" from the Suburbs to the Castle on Independence Day, which involved a lot of damage, such as vandalizing a dozen cars and destroying the windows of several shops. The demonstration set off from Itäkeskus and sought access to the Presidential Palace for the Independence Day Reception.
