= Municipal Workers' Union =

Trade union of Finland

The Municipal Workers' Union (Finnish: Kunta-alan ammattiliitto, KTV) was a trade union representing local government workers in Finland.

The union as founded in 1931 as the Finnish Municipal Workers' Union, and affiliated to the Finnish Federation of Trade Unions (SAK). It resigned in 1962, but in 1969 was a founding affiliate of SAK's successor, the Central Organisation of Finnish Trade Unions.

The union changed its name to become the "Municipal Workers' Union" in 1958, and then the Local Government Union in 1991. In 1982, the Mental Health and Disability Union merged into KTV, which became the largest union in Finland, and by 1998, it had 220,000 members.

At the start of 2006, KTV merged with the Organisation of State Employees, the State and Special Employees' Union, the Finnish Custom Officers' Union, the Finnish Prison Officers' Union, and the Coastguard Union, to form the Public and Welfare Services Union.

== Presidents ==
1946: Juho Kivistö
1951: Reino Heinonen
1971: Jaakko Riikonen
1973: Olavi Dahl
1979: Pekka Salonen
1989: Jouni Riskilä
2001: Tuire Santamäki-Vuori
