= Finnish Seafarers' Union =

Trade union of Finland

- Suomen Merimies-Unioni; Finlands Sjömans-Union

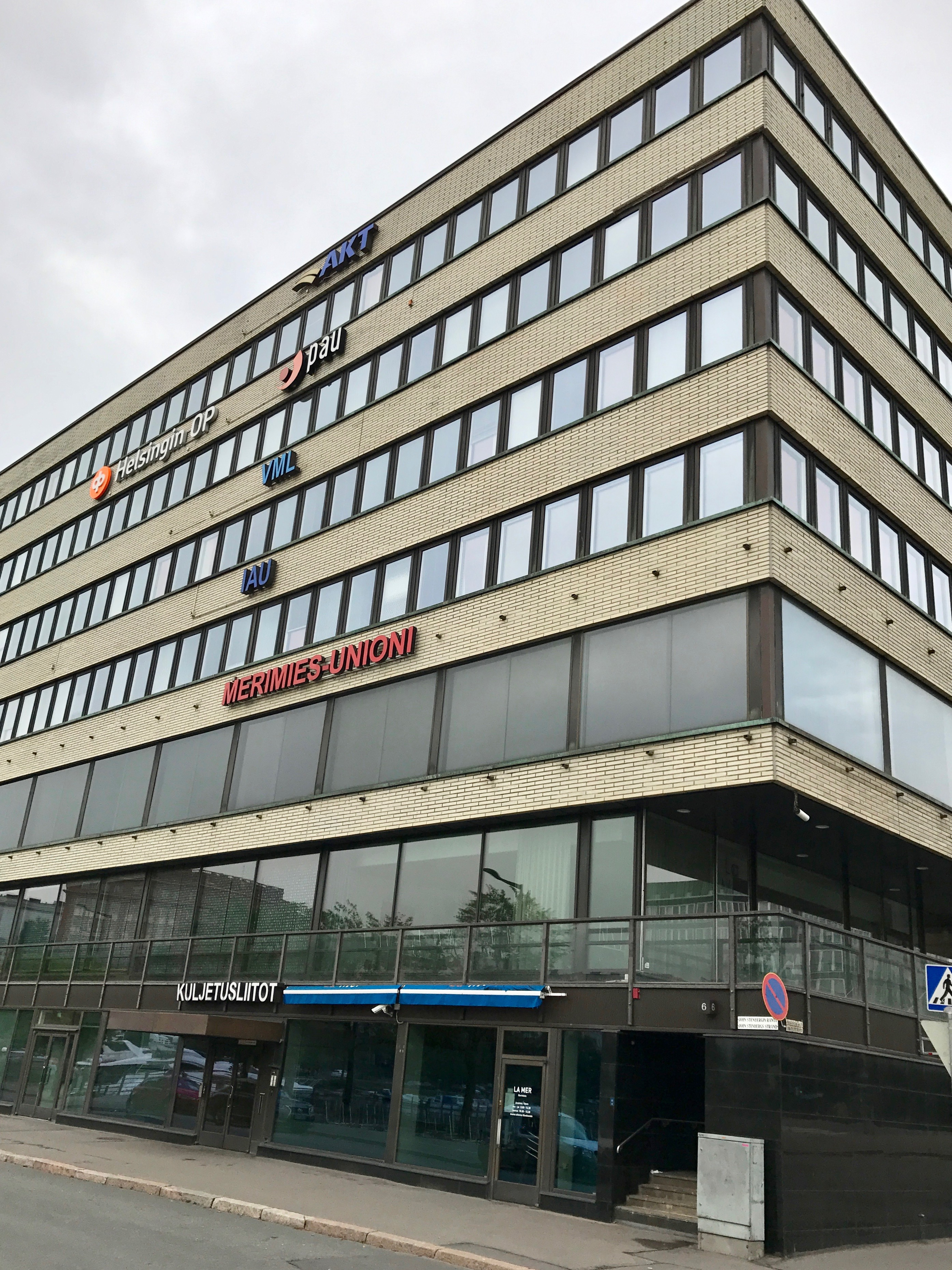
- Headquarters building
- Formation: 1916; 110 years ago
- Founded at: Helsinki
- Dissolved: 1930 (immediately recreated under same name)
- Type: Trade union
- Headquarters: Kallio, Helsinki
- Location: Finland
- Field: Maritime transport
- Members: 9,500 (2020)
- Official language: Finnish, Swedish
- President: Joachim Alatalo
- Secretaries: Heikki Karla & Tetta Härkönen
- Legal Counsel: Pia Levin
- CFO: Sini-Elina Kärsämä
- Key people: Niilo Wälläri
- Affiliations: SAK
- Website: smu.fi
- Formerly called: Helsinki Seamen's and Firemen's Union, Finnish Seamen's and Firemen's Union, Finnish Seamen's Union

The Finnish Seafarers' Union (FSU, formerly known as Finnish Seamen's Union; (Finnish: Suomen Merimies-Unioni SMU, Swedish: Finlands Sjömans-Union) is a trade union representing maritime and inland waterway transport workers in Finland.

The Helsinki Seamen's and Firemen's Union was founded in 1916, and from 1920, it was known as the Finnish Seamen's and Firemen's Union, covering the whole country. It was banned in 1930, but a group of socialist trade unionists immediately founded a new union of the same name, and so the union considers its history to be continuous from 1916. In 1934, it joined the Finnish Federation of Trade Unions (SAK).

In 1938, Niilo Wälläri was elected as the union's president, known for his advocacy of industrial action. Under his leadership the union secured a closed shop for the Finnish Merchant Navy. The union's membership grew, reaching 6,805 by 1955, but in 1956 it resigned from the SAK. Three years later, it was a founding affiliate of the rival Finnish Trade Union Federation (SAJ), and since 1969 it has been affiliated to its successor, the Central Organisation of Finnish Trade Unions.

By 1998, the union had 10,146 members, while in 2020, its membership was about 9,500.

== Presidents ==
1938: Niilo Wallari
1968: Olavi Keitele
1976: Reijo Anttila
1992: Per-Erik Nelin
2000: Simo Zitting
