= Industrial Union TEAM =

Trade union of Finland

- TEAM Teollisuusalojen ammattiliitto
- Merged into: Metalworkers' Union, Wood and Allied Workers' Union
- Successor: Industrial Union
- Formation: 2010
- Dissolved: 2017; 9 years ago
- Type: Trade union
- Publication: Intiim

The Industrial Union TEAM (Finnish: Teollisuusalojen ammattiliitto, TEAM) was a trade union representing manufacturing and print workers in Finland.

The Chemical Union had been keen to unite the various industrial unions in Finland for several years, and opened negotiations with six other unions. The Metalworkers' Union withdrew, followed by all the others excepting the Media Union. At the start of 2010, the Chemical Union and Media Union merged, forming the Industrial Union TEAM. Like its predecessors, the union affiliated to the Central Organisation of Finnish Trade Unions.

The union was initially led by Timo Vallunta, former president of the Chemical Union. In 2015, Vallunta was succeeded by Heli Puura.

In 2017, the union merged with the Metalworkers' Union and the Wood and Allied Workers' Union, to form the Industrial Union.
