= Finnish Trade Union Federation (1960) =

The Finnish Trade Union Federation (Finnish: Suomen Ammattijärjestö, SAJ) was a national trade union centre in Finland.

The federation was established in 1960, as a split from the Finnish Federation of Trade Unions (SAK), by unions which supported the Social Democratic Party of Finland. By 1968, the federation had 17 affiliates, but a total of only 95,166 members. In 1969, it merged with the SAK, to form the Central Organisation of Finnish Trade Unions.

== Affiliates ==
The following unions held membership of the federation for some period:

| Union | Abbreviation | Founded | Affiliated | Reason left | Left | Membership (1965) |
|---|---|---|---|---|---|---|
| Air Transport Workers' Union | | 1962 | 1962 | Transferred to SAK | 1969 | 726 |
| Federation of Railway Trade Unions | | 1960 | 1960 | Transferred to SAK | 1969 | 6,255 |
| Finnish Electrical Workers' Union | SS | 1955 | 1963 | Transferred to SAK | 1969 | 9,494 |
| Finnish Mining Union | | 1966 | 1966 | Transferred to SAK | 1969 | N/A |
| Finnish Printers' and Bookbinders' Union | VA | 1894 | 1960 | Resigned | 1967 | 13,131 |
| Finnish Road Transport Union | SAL | 1948 | | Transferred to SAK | 1969 | 7,850 |
| Finnish Seamen's Union | SMU | 1930 | | Transferred to SAK | 1969 | 10,050 |
| Finnish Social Democratic Journalists' Union | SSSL | 1907 | 1960 | Transferred to SAK | 1969 | 150 |
| Finnish Union of Paper Machine Operators | | 1956 | | Transferred to SAK | 1969 | 220 |
| Finnish Union of Precious Metal Workers | | 1906 | | Transferred to SAK | 1969 | 892 |
| Finnish Wood Industry Workers' Union | SPL | 1931 | 1960 | Transferred to SAK | 1969 | 15,585 |
| General and Speciality Workers' Union | YEA | 1960 | 1960 | Transferred to SAK | 1969 | 10,982 |
| Leather and Rubber Trade Union | KINL | 1960 | 1960 | Transferred to SAK | 1969 | 3,715 |
| Road Workers' Union | | 1963 | 1963 | Transferred to SAK | 1969 | 1,412 |
| Steel, Mining and Machine Shop Workers' Union | | 1960 | 1960 | Transferred to SAK | 1969 | 6,891 |
| Textile and Knitting Workers' Union | KNL | 1952 | 1960 | Transferred to SAK | 1969 | 7,538 |
| Union of Clothing Workers | SVL | 1938 | 1960 | Transferred to SAK | 1969 | 3,872 |
| Union of Organising Officers | | 1960 | 1960 | Transferred to SAK | 1969 | 81 |
| Workshop Workers' Union | | 1960 | 1960 | Transferred to SAK | 1969 | 3,946 |
