= Finnish Federation of Trade Unions =

The Finnish Federation of Trade Unions (Finnish: Suomen Ammattiyhdistysten Keskusliitto, SAK) was a national trade union centre in Finland.

The federation was established in 1930, after the Finnish Trade Union Federation (SAJ) was banned. Its initial affiliates were unions which supported the Social Democratic Party of Finland, whereas the SAJ had been dominated by communists. Over time, the communists became prominent in the SAK, and this led a group of unions to split away in 1960 and form a new Finnish Trade Union Federation (SAJ). In 1969, the SAK merged with the new SAJ, to form the Central Organisation of Finnish Trade Unions.

== Affiliates ==
Union	Abbreviation	Joined	Reason not affiliated	Left	Membership (1955)
Association of Mental Nurses		1941	Resigned	1960	2,078
Association of Municipal and Hospital Workers		1963	Transferred to new SAK	1969	N/A
Association of Rural Municipal Officers		1947	Resigned	1957	497
Automobile and Transport Workers' Association	AKL	1960	Transferred to new SAK	1969	N/A
Commercial Workers' Union		1930	Resigned	1961	14,233
Caretakers' Union	KL	1948	Transferred to new SAK	1969	2,228
Customs Union		1945	Resigned	1960	N/A
Finnish Air Transport Union		1957	Transferred to new SAK	1969	N/A
Finnish Association of the Weaving Industry	SKL	1930	Dissolved	1952	N/A
Finnish Bricklayers' Union		1931	Transferred to new SAK	1969	5,634
Finnish Construction Workers' Union		1931	Transferred to new SAK	1969	27,176
Finnish Divers' Union		1945	Transferred to new SAK	1969	233
Finnish Food Workers' Union	SEL	1932	Transferred to new SAK	1969	8,007
Finnish Forestry and Lumber Workers' Union	SMUL	1946	Expelled	1949	N/A
Finnish General Workers' Union		1930	Transferred to new SAK	1969	10,713
Finnish Glass and Porcelain Workers' Union		1930	Transferred to new SAK	1969	2,521
Finnish Locomotive Engineers' Union	VML	1943	Resigned	1960	4,489
Finnish Mechanics' Union		1946	Transferred to new SAK	1969	352
Finnish Musicians' Union		1945	Resigned	1956	1,046
Finnish Police Union	SPJL	1945	Resigned	1956	3,000
Finnish Port Workers' Union	SL	1957	Transferred to new SAK	1969	N/A
Finnish Postal Workers' Union		1945	Resigned	1960	3,597
Finnish Precious Metal Workers' Union		1930	Joined SAJ	1960	721
Finnish Printers' and Bookbinders' Union	SKL	1931	Resigned	1958	9,581
Finnish Road Workers' Union	SAL	1948	Resigned	1958	5,059
Finnish Seamen's Union	SM-U	1934	Resigned	1956	6,805
Finnish Social Democratic Journalists' Union	SSSL	1931	Resigned	1958	131
Finnish Supervisors' Union		1949		1960	
Finnish Textile Mechanics' Union		1952	Transferred to new SAK	1969	1,110
Finnish Transport Workers' Association		1936	Dissolved	1949	N/A
Finnish Wood Workers' Union	SPL	1931	Joined SAJ	1960	18,244
Forestry Trade Union		1945		1949	N/A
General Journalists' Union	YLL	1947	Transferred to new SAK	1969	145
Hotel and Restaurant Workers' Union	HRHL	1940	Transferred to new SAK	1969	3,560
Journalists' Union		1960	Transferred to new SAK	1969	N/A
Leather, Footwear and Rubber Workers' Union	SNJKL	1938	Transferred to new SAK	1969	6,850
Metalworkers' Union	Metalli	1931	Transferred to new SAK	1969	39,257
Municipal Workers' Union	KTV	1932	Resigned	1962	23,368
National Union of State Officers		1945	Transferred to new SAK	1969	
Paper Industry Workers' Union		1930	Transferred to new SAK	1969	15,657
Pilots' and Lighthousekeepers' Union		1945	Resigned	1958	474
Prison Officers' Union	VVL	1945	Resigned	1960	1,293
Railway Workers' Union	RAUTL	1930	Transferred to new SAK	1969	12,063
Rural Workers' Union	SML	1945	Transferred to new SAK	1969	8,108
Textile and Knitting Workers' Union	KNL	1952	Joined SAJ	1960	7,312
Textile Workers' Union	TtL	1960	Transferred to new SAK	1969	N/A
Union of Industrial and Agricultural Prison Officers		1954	Resigned	1960	166
Union of Clothing Workers	SVL	1938	Joined SAJ	1960	3,775
Union of Male Elementary School Teachers		1945	Dissolved	1957	100
Union of School Teachers		1946	Expelled	1954	N/A
Wood Workers' Federation	PTL	1960	Transferred to new SAK	1969	N/A

== Presidents ==
1930: Edvard Huttunen
1937: Eero A. Wuori
1945: Erkki Härmä
1946: Emil Huunonen
1949: Aku Sumu
1954: Eero Antikainen
1959: Reino Heinonen
1960: Vihtori Rantanen
1966: Niilo Hämäläinen
