= MMA (disambiguation) =

MMA, or mixed martial arts, is a full-contact combat sport.

MMA or mma may also refer to:

== Business and commerce ==
- MacRobertson Miller Airlines, Western Australia, 1934–1980s
- Maldives Monetary Authority, the central bank of Maldives
- Malta Maritime Authority, a government agency of Malta
- Manufacturer's Mutual Association, later Association of Licensed Automobile Manufacturers
- Money market account, a type of bank account
- Former Montreal, Maine and Atlantic Railway, a reporting mark
- Music Modernization Act, 2018, a U.S. law
- Myanmar Music Association, a Myanmar's music industry association
- Melon Music Awards, a South Korean annual music awards
- Union of Sales and Marketing Professionals (Finnish: Myynnin ja markkinoinnin ammattilaiset), a Finnish trade union

== Medicine ==
- Mammalian meat allergy, or alpha-gal allergy
- Methenmadinone acetate, a progestin
- Maxillomandibular advancement, a jaw surgical procedure
- Methylmalonic acidemia, an autosomal genetic disorder
- Methylmalonic acid
- Middle meningeal artery
- Monomelic amyotrophy, a motor neuron disease

== Politics and religion ==
- Metropolitan Manila Authority, predecessor of the Metropolitan Manila Development Authority (MMDA), a Philippine government agency
- Medicare Modernization Act, a U.S. law
- Muttahida Majlis-e-Amal, a Pakistani political alliance

== Science and technology ==
- Manual metal arc welding
- Methyl methacrylate, an organic compound
- Methylmalonic acid, a dicarboxylic acid
- MIDI Manufacturers Association
- Millimeter Array, an American radio telescope project
- Monomethylaniline, an aniline derivative
- Motor Mixing Algorithm, a rotation mechanism on Drone, mixing Thrust, Yaw, Pitch, and Roll principles
- Multimission Maritime Aircraft or P-8 Poseidon, US Navy program
- Multi-messenger astronomy
- Tecnam MMA, a variant of the Tecnam P2006T aircraft
- 3-Methoxy-4-methylamphetamine, a psychedelic drug
- meta-Methoxyamphetamine (3-methoxyamphetamine), a psychoactive drug

== Schools ==
- Maine Maritime Academy, a public college in Castine, Maine, United States
- Massachusetts Maritime Academy, a public college in Buzzards Bay, Massachusetts, United States
- Massanutten Military Academy, a college-prep, military school in Woodstock, Virginia, United States
- Maximo Mirafuentes Academy, a private high school in Tagum, Davao del Norte, Philippines
- Milford Mill Academy, a public high school in Baltimore County, Maryland, United States
- Military Medical Academy, a teaching hospital in Sofia, Bulgaria
- Missouri Military Academy, a boarding school in Mexico, Missouri, United States
- Mayfield Montessori Academy, a private school in Quezon City, Metro Manila, Philippines

== Music ==
- Melon Music Awards, an awards ceremony in South Korea
- Metro FM Music Awards, an awards ceremony in South Africa

== Other uses ==
- MMA - Meu Melhor Amigo, a 2025 Brazilian film
- Military Manpower Administration, a South Korean government agency
- Maria Mitchell Association, Nantucket, Massachusetts, United States
- Maastricht Formation (MMa), a geologic formation in Belgium and the Netherlands
- Mama language (ISO 639-3 code: mma)
- Malmö Bulltofta Airport (IATA code MMA), a former airport in Malmö, Sweden

== See also ==
- MA (disambiguation)
- Mam (disambiguation)
- AMM (disambiguation)
- MAA (disambiguation)
- MMAS (disambiguation)
