= Confederation of State Employees' Unions – Pardia =

Trade union of Finland

Pardia
- Confederation of State Employees' Unions
- Palkansaajajärjestö Pardia; Löntagarorganisationen Pardia
- Merged into: Trade Union Pro
- Founded: 1993
- Dissolved: 1 January 2019
- Headquarters: Helsinki, Finland
- Location: Finland
- Members: 60,000
- Affiliations: STTK
- Website: www.pardia.fi

The Confederation of State Employees' Unions (Pardia, Finnish: Palkansaajajärjestö Pardia, Swedish: Löntagarorganisationen Pardia) was a trade union in Finland. The majority of Pardia's 60,000 members worked in governmental offices and institutions, while others were employed by public utility companies and enterprises. Approximately 50 percent of all Finnish state employees were members of Pardia.

In 1990, the Finnish Police Union, the Union of Civil Servants, and the Union of Finnish Employees, all affiliates of the Confederation of Salaried Employees (TVK), formed TVK-State, as an umbrella organisation. The TVK went bankrupt in 1992, and TVK-State was dissolved, and replaced by a new, independent, organisation, the Confederation of State Employees' Organisations (VHKL). In 1993, the unions joined the Finnish Confederation of Salaried Employees (STTK), and founded the "Confederation of State Employees' Unions". In 2000, it adopted the short name of Pardia. The Finnish Police Union disaffiliated in 2016.

At the start of 2019, Pardia merged into Trade Union Pro.
