= Collective =

Group of entities sharing interest

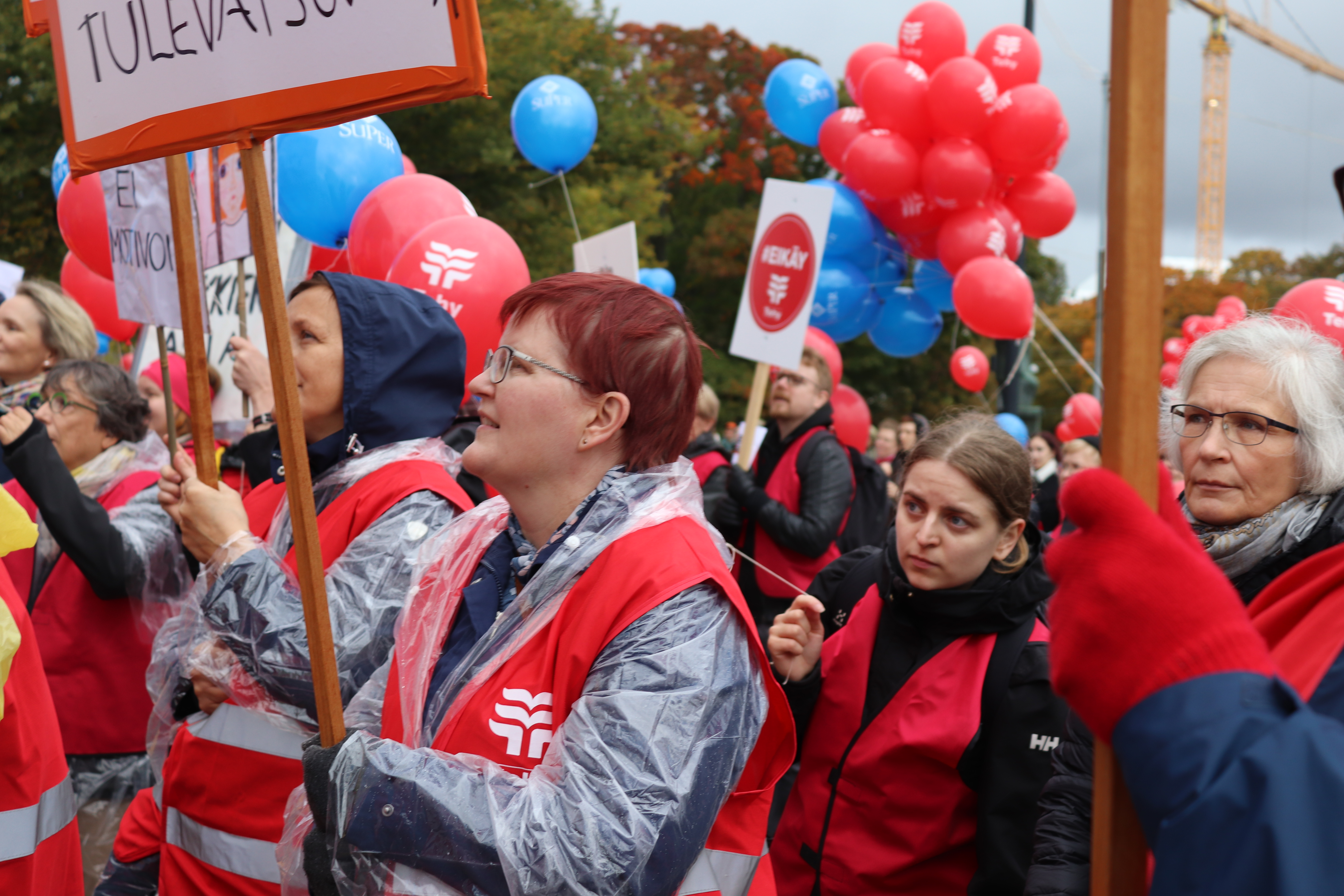
Two groups (Finnish nursing unions Tehy and SuPer) working towards a shared goal

A collective is a group of entities that share or are motivated by at least one common issue or interest or work together to achieve a common objective. Collectives can differ from cooperatives in that they are not necessarily focused upon an economic benefit or saving, though they can be.

The term "collective" is sometimes used to describe a species as a whole—for example, the human collective.

For political purposes, a collective is defined by decentralized, or "majority-rules" decision-making styles.

== Types of groups ==
Collectives are sometimes characterised by attempts to share and exercise political and social power and to make decisions on a consensus-driven and egalitarian basis.

A commune or intentional community, which may also be known as a "collective household", is a group of people who live together in some kind of dwelling or residence, or in some other arrangement (e.g., sharing land). Collective households may be organized for a specific purpose (e.g., relating to business, parenting, or some other shared interest).

Artist collectives, including musical collectives, are typically a collection of individuals with similar interests in producing and documenting art as a group. These groups can range in size from a few people to thousands of members. The style of art produced can have vast differences. Motivations can be for a common cause or individually motivated purposes. Some collectives are simply people who enjoy painting with someone else and have no other goals or motivations for forming their collective.

A worker cooperative is a type of horizontal collective wherein a business functions as a partnership of individual professionals, recognizing them as equals and rewarding them for their expertise. The working collective aims to reduce costs to clients while maintaining healthy rewards for participating partners. This is accomplished by eliminating the operating costs that are needed to support levels of management.

== See also ==
- Colectivo (Venezuela)
- Collective agreement
- Collective bargaining
- Collective farming
- Collective guilt
- Collective intentionality
- Collective ownership
- Collective punishment
- Collective security
- College (Catholic canon law)
- Community
- Coparenting § Coparenting by more than two adults
- Corporatism
- Discursive dilemma
- Green Mountain Anarchist Collective
- Kibbutz
- Kolkhoz
- Law collective
- Mutual aid
