= MA =

Ma, MA, or mA may refer to:

== Academia ==
- Master of Arts, a degree award
  - Master of Arts (Oxford, Cambridge and Dublin), an academic status awarded to holders of a Bachelors of Arts degree at the University of Oxford, the University of Cambridge, or the University of Dublin (Trinity College)
  - Master of Arts (Scottish Ancient universities), a first, undergraduate honours degree at the ancient universities of Scotland
- Marin Academy, a high school in San Rafael, California
- Menlo-Atherton High School, a public high school in Atherton, California
- Minnehaha Academy, a private high school in Minneapolis, Minnesota
- Monument Academy, a charter school in El Paso county, Colordo

== Arts and entertainment ==
=== Fictional characters ===
- Ma (The Lion King), a main character in the animated film Lion King 1½
- Ma Beagle, in the Donald Duck universe
- Ma Hunkel, a DC Comics character
- Ma and Pa Kettle, a 1940s and 1950s comic film character
- Ma Perkins, an American radio soap opera (1932-1960)
- The Ma family, in the 2014 South Korean television series 4 Legendary Witches
- Ma Junior, Piccolo's alias in the 23rd Tenkaichi Budōkai

=== Music ===
==== Albums ====
- Ma (Anjan Dutt album) (1998)
- Ma (Rare Earth album) (1973)
- Ma (Sagarika album) (1998)
- Ma (Zubeen Garg album) (2019)
- Ma (Devendra Banhart album) (2019)
- Ma! (He's Making Eyes at Me), by Lena Zavaroni (1974)

==== Performers ====
- Massive Attack, a British trip hop band
- Mā (musician), New Zealand songwriter and rapper

==== Other uses in music ====
- In music instructions, "but", especially in the phrase ma non troppo (see Glossary of musical terminology#M)
- In tonic sol-fa, a flattened me
- Encyclopaedia Metallum: The Metal Archives, a website devoted to heavy metal bands

=== Other uses in arts and entertainment ===
- Ma (2019 film), a horror film starring Octavia Spencer and Luke Evans
- Ma (2015 film), a drama film written and directed by Celia Rowlson-Hall
- Ma (negative space), a Japanese concept of negative space
- Memory Alpha, a Star Trek-oriented wiki
- Miss America, a beauty pageant, and the title awarded at said pageant
- MA (journal), a Hungarian art magazine

== Businesses and organizations ==
- Malév Hungarian Airlines (IATA designator: MA)
- Mastercard (NYSE stock symbol: MA)
- Montserrat Airways Ltd (MA LTD), trading as FlyMontserrat
- Motorcycling Australia
- Motorsport Australia
- Orange Movement (Movimento Arancione), an Italian political party
- Market America, a product brokerage and internet marketing company
- Museums Association, UK
- Musicians Australia, a trade union run by the Media, Entertainment and Arts Alliance

== Language ==
- Ma (cuneiform), a cuneiform sign
- Ma (Indic), an Indic consonant
- Ma (Javanese) (ꦩ), a letter in the Javanese script
- Ma (kana) (ま, マ), a Japanese kana
- Ma (negative space), a Japanese reading of a Sino-Japanese character
- Ma language, spoken in the Democratic Republic of Congo
- Ma language (Papuan), a language of Papua New Guinea

== Mythology ==
- Ma (Sumerian mythology), a Sumerian word to regard the Primordial Land
- Ma (goddess), an Anatolian goddess
- Ma, a mythohistoric entrepreneur for whom the Malaysian town of Marang, Terengganu was purportedly named

== People ==
=== Names ===
- Ma, an informal synonym for mother
- Ma (surname) (马/馬), a common Chinese family name
- Ma (surname 麻), a less common Chinese surname
- (Mª or Ma.), according to Spanish naming customs#Maria

=== Groups ===
- Ma clique, a group of warlords from 1919 until 1928
- Mạ people, a Vietnamese ethnic group
- Meshwesh, an ancient Libyan tribe

=== Individuals ===
- Ma Barker (1873–1935), American criminal and mother of criminals
- Ma Beland (1870–1952), American drug trafficker
- Miriam A. Ferguson (1875–1961), twice governor of Texas
- Harriet Pullen (1860–1947), American entrepreneur and hotelier
- Ma Rainey, stage name of American blues singer Gertrude Pridgett (1886–1939)
- Ma Anand Sheela, Osho movement leader convicted of multiple attempted murders

== Places ==
- Ma River, a river in Vietnam and Laos
- Ma, Tibet, a village
- Morocco (country code "Ma")
  - .ma, the Internet domain for Morocco
- Madagascar (country code "MA")
- Maranhão, Brazil (postal code "MA")
- Maluku (province), Indonesia (subdivision code "MA")
- Massachusetts, a US state (postal abbreviation "MA")

== Science, technology, and mathematics ==
=== Chemistry ===
- Methyl anthranilate, used as a bird repellent
- Mesaconitine, a toxin from plants

=== Health and medicine ===
- MA (chemotherapy), a chemotherapy regimen
- Marijuana Anonymous, a group recovery program
- Medical assistant, a type of health care worker
- Metabolic acidosis, a medical condition characterized by increased acid production
- Metabolic alkalosis, a medical condition with an elevated pH level

=== Mathematics ===
- MA (complexity), a set of decision problems that can be decided by an Arthur–Merlin protocol
- Martin's axiom, an axiom in mathematical logic
- Moving-average model (MA), in statistics

=== Measurements ===
- Mach number (Ma), a measure of speed compared to the speed of sound
- Megaannum (Ma), one million years
- Megaampere (MA), a multiple of the SI unit of electric current, the ampere
- Milliampere (mA), a multiple of the SI unit of electric current, the ampere

=== Other uses in science and technology ===
- .ma, the Internet domain for Morocco
- Mechanical advantage, mechanical multiplier of input force
- Mechanical alloying, a technique to produce alloys
- Ford MA, a 2002 concept car
- Nissan MA engine, an automotive engine introduced in 1982

== Other uses ==
- Martial arts, systems for combat
- Master-at-arms (United States Navy), an enlisted rating in the US Navy
- Middle Ages, a period of European history

== See also ==
- "Mature audience", a U.S. television rating system category, abbreviated TV-MA
- Maa (disambiguation)
