= Erto =

Erto is the name of:

- Erto e Casso, an Italian municipality
- Federation of Special Service and Clerical Employees, a Finnish trade union
