= The Finnish Business School Graduates =

- The Finnish Business School Graduates
- Suomen Ekonomit - Finlands Ekonomer
- Founded: 1935; 91 years ago
- Location: Finland
- Key people: Anja Uljas; Timo Saranpää (president)
- Website: www.ekonomit.fi

The Finnish Business School Graduates (Finnish: Suomen Ekonomit, Swedish: Finlands Ekonomer), founded in 1935, is a central organization for graduates and students in economics and business administration. It consists of 25 regional associations and 13 student societies. The association has over 50,000 members, including graduate members and over 15,000 students. Its graduate members from Finnish universities have a B.Sc. (Econ. Bus. & Adm.) or M.Sc. (Econ. Bus. & Adm.) degree. Applications from foreign university graduates are assessed individually. A member must have at least an academic bachelor's-level degree (e.g., BA, BSc) in business studies. Many of its members are working outside Finland. The Finnish Business School Graduates attempts to improve the success of its members as individuals. To do so, it implements several services concerning educational, professional, social issues and labour market conditions, always according to the needs of the members. On behalf of its members, it negotiates and concludes collective agreements concerning salaries and conditions of employment. The association is the fourth-biggest affiliate of AKAVA (the Confederation of Unions for Professional and Managerial Staff in Finland).

== History ==
From 1924 onward, small business school graduate associations and societies were founded in the largest cities in Finland. The Finnish Business School Graduates' predecessor was the Swedish Business School (Hanken) alumni association, Ekonomföreningen Niord. The follower, Ekonomiyhdistys Ry, was founded in 1935. In 1951, ten associations joined together to create Ekonomiliitto, the Finnish Association of Business School Graduates. In 1973, members and associations of the Swedish-speaking Ekonomförbund rf joined the umbrella organization. In summer 2014, the association changed its name to Suomen Ekonomit - Finlands Ekonomer - The Finnish Business School Graduates.

In the beginning, the main function of the associations was to convey job opportunities to graduating members. It was all about networking and socializing. Later on, the functions have evolved toward a wider approach to issues regarding employment relations: Salary surveys, legal advice, career guidance, and training.

Asociatios, social policy, and labor market representation: The Finnish employment relations model is based on a relatively high level of collective bargaining in relation to local wage settlements. For white-collar workers, collective bargaining in the Finnish model is based on strong professional unions and their collaborations. The main interest representation function is to produce and negotiate industry-level collective bargaining agreements together with other unions in Akava and collective negotiation organizations.

The association's policy is to guarantee decent wage development throughout the industry, ensure proper conditions in employment contracts, and promote wellbeing at the workplace. Promoting equality and the general knowledge of labor market development among members and the public is also essential. The education policy occurs in coordination with universities, member organizations, student organizations, social organizations, and political parties. The goal is to maintain the esteem and quality of business education at the academic level and the graduates’ expertise.

== The organisation ==
The Federal Assembly holds the highest quorum in the decision-making of The Finnish Business School Graduates. It convenes at least twice a year. Members of the assembly are selected by member organizations. The board consists of 9–12 members, and they are responsible for planning, monitoring, and important decisions. The term of office for the members of the board is 3 years. The student representative on the board changes annually. The acting chairman of the board is Timo Saranpää. The executive director is Anja Uljas, and the director of lobbying and interest representation is Riku Salokannel.
