= Jessikka Aro =

Finnish journalist

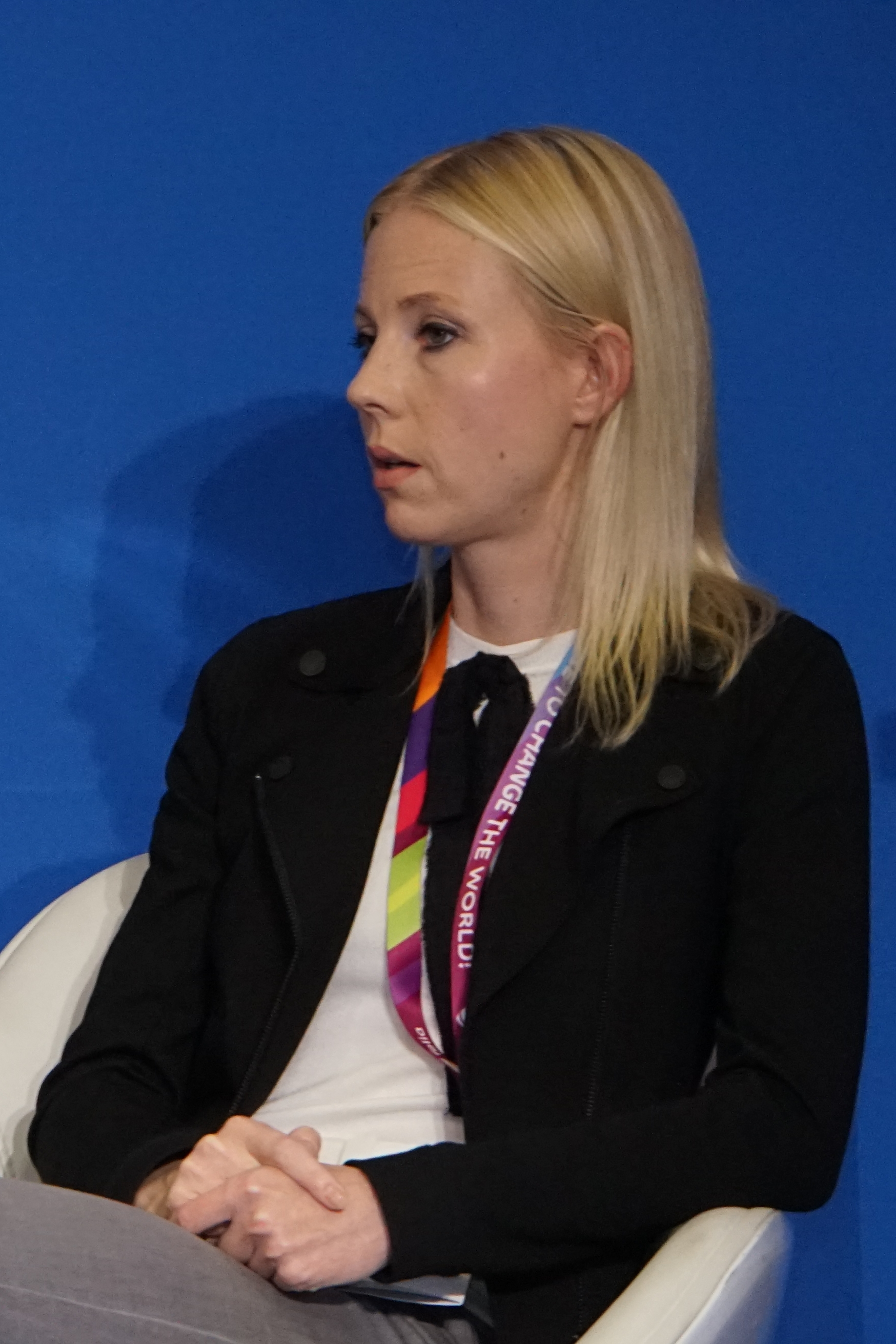
- Jessikka Aro in 2017
- Born: 19 December 1980 (age 45); Hyvinkää, Finland
- Occupations: Journalist; Investigative reporter; Author
- Employer(s): Yle, Tehy
- Awards: Finnish Grand Prize for Journalism (2015) Ambassador Hickey Woman of Courage Award (2024)

Jessikka Aro (born 19 December 1980) is a Finnish investigative reporter working for Finland's public service broadcaster Yle, specializing in Russia, extremism and information warfare. She is the author of the non-fiction books Putin's Trolls: On the Frontlines of Russia's Information War Against the World and Putin's World War.

Due to her investigations of pro-Russian Internet trolls and their influence on public debates outside Russia's borders, she became the target of an international propaganda and hate speech campaign. This harassment led to three people being convicted in October 2018. Aro won the Bonnier Journalism Prize in 2016 for her work exposing Russian trolls on social media. In 2019, the U.S. Department of State awarded her the International Women of Courage Award, but the award was rescinded just before the ceremony. In June 2024, the U.S. Embassy in Finland recognized her work with the Ambassador Hickey Woman of Courage Award.

Since February 2026, Jessikka Aro has been serving as Tehy’s Advocacy Director.

== Career ==
Aro saw the actions of Kremlin-connected internet trolls as "a threat to Finnish people's freedom of speech" telling Deutsche Welle (DW) she "was really astonished to find out that it's quite big — super big actually."

After a visit to St Petersburg to investigate the Internet Research Agency, where she interviewed employees at the troll factory who create fake online accounts and produce fake stories, she encountered a significant backlash from pro-Russian trolls. She has described abusive responses including a phone call from a Ukrainian number with the sound of a machine gun firing on the other end, as well as a cell phone text message purporting to be from her father (who had died 20 years earlier) indicating "he was keeping watch on her". Russian nationalist websites described her as working for the West's security agencies. A vocal critic was Johan Bäckman, who made false claims about her assisting the Estonian and United States security services. Aro told Foreign Policy magazine: "The goal of these campaigns is to discredit the voices in Finland that are critical of Russia." Her series of articles led to Aro receiving Bonnier's Award for Journalism in March 2016.

Officials with the European Union told the Sydney Morning Herald it was an escalation of Russian "information warfare" against the West. In 2016, Aro published an article in the journal of the centre-right European Peoples Party describing the "brutal" harassment that she attributes to Russian trolls. This behaviour includes doxing such as revealing her conviction for drug possession when she was 20, which was turned into a false claim she is a "NATO drug dealer".

In October 2018, the Helsinki District Court found Ilja Janitskin, Johan Bäckman and a woman guilty of sustained defamation against Aro. The final judgement said the two men had committed "an exceptionally aggravated set of crimes". Janitskin, the founder of the MV-Lehti website was sentenced to 22 months in jail on 16 criminal counts while Bäckman received a year's suspended jail sentence for aggravated defamation and stalking. They were required to pay damages to Aro and other plaintiffs in the case. The New York Times called this "the first time that a European country had taken action against pro-Russian disinformation spread through social media, websites and news outlets controlled by or linked to Russia". Bäckman described his conviction as "another dirty trick by NATO".

In February 2026, Jessikka Aro was appointed as Tehy’s Advocacy Director, responsible for enhancing the effectiveness of advocacy on behalf of Tehy’s members.

== Awards and honors ==
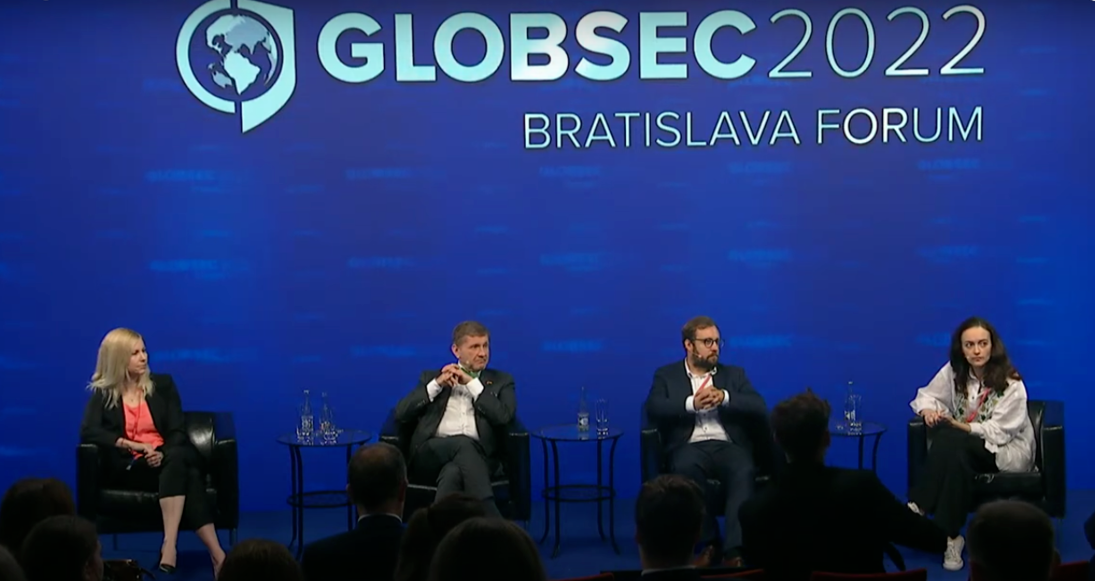
Risking it all for the Truth: Journalists and Media in Crises - Panel in Bratislava in June 2022. Left to right Aro, Konstantin Eggert, Lukáš Onderčanin and Olga Rudenko of the Kyiv Independent

Aro received the Bonnier's Finnish Grand Prize for Journalism in 2016 for her series of articles investigating pro-Russian Internet trolls in Finland. Her work exposed the operations of Russian influence campaigns, which resulted in her becoming a target of a harassment campaign by the trolls.

Aro told Foreign Policy that the US State Department had informed her in January 2019 that she would be one of the winners of the 2019 International Women of Courage Awards. The notification, described as a "regrettable error" by a State Department representative, was rescinded shortly before the award ceremony. According to Aro and U.S. officials familiar with the internal deliberations, the award was rescinded after U.S. officials reviewed Aro's social media posts and found she had criticized President Donald Trump. A US State Department spokesperson did not respond to questions on the identity of the decision maker or the reasons for the decision. The relevant award was presented to Sri Lanka's Marini De Livera instead. An editorial in The Washington Post commented: "Ms. Aro deserved the award. She should hold her head high for courage, unlike those who denied her the honor." Reporters Without Borders pointed out the decision was inconsistent with the values proclaimed by the award, which is given to women who “have demonstrated exceptional courage and leadership in advocating for peace, justice, human rights, gender equality, and women’s empowerment, often at great personal risk and sacrifice.” The United States Senate Committee on Foreign Relations requested an investigation by the Office of the Inspector General of the Department of State, and in September 2020, the Inspector General concluded that the State Department provided a false explanation for rescinding the award.

In June 2024, the U.S. Embassy in Finland presented Aro with the Ambassador Hickey Woman of Courage Award, a recognition created specifically for her. The award was given in acknowledgment of her long-standing work investigating and exposing Russian disinformation campaigns, and the personal risks and sustained online harassment she has faced as a result. Aro described the new award as deeply meaningful and supportive.

== See also ==
- Russian web brigades
