= VVL =

VVL can stand for:

- Prison Officers' Union, in Finland
- The Union of Insurance Employees, in Finland, usually written "VvL"
- Variable valve lift, a type of automotive piston engine
- The lectin of Hairy vetch (Vicia villosa)
