= LTA =

LTA may refer to:

== Science ==
- Lipoteichoic acid
- Lighter than air, sometimes used in ballooning as in an "LTA pilot license"
- Linde type A molecular sieve, an aluminosilicate drying agent
- Light transmission aggregometry, a method for measuring the aggregation of platelets in blood
- Long-term average, a type of moving average
- Lymphotoxin alpha

== Companies and organizations ==
- Business Administration Union, a trade union in Finland
- Land Transport Authority, a statutory board under the Ministry of Transport of Singapore
- Lawn Tennis Association in the United Kingdom
- League of Legends Championship of The Americas, a former esports league for League of Legends
- Learning Through Art, an educational program of the Guggenheim Museum in New York
- Lambda Theta Alpha, Latin Sorority, Incorporated
- Línea Turística Aereotuy, a Venezuelan airline

== Other uses ==
- Lieutenant in Singapore Civil Defence
- Legs, Trunk, Arms, now PR3, an adaptive rowing classification
- Long Term Agreement, a.k.a. Frame contract Framework agreement
- Louis Troy Austin (born 1991), English singer
