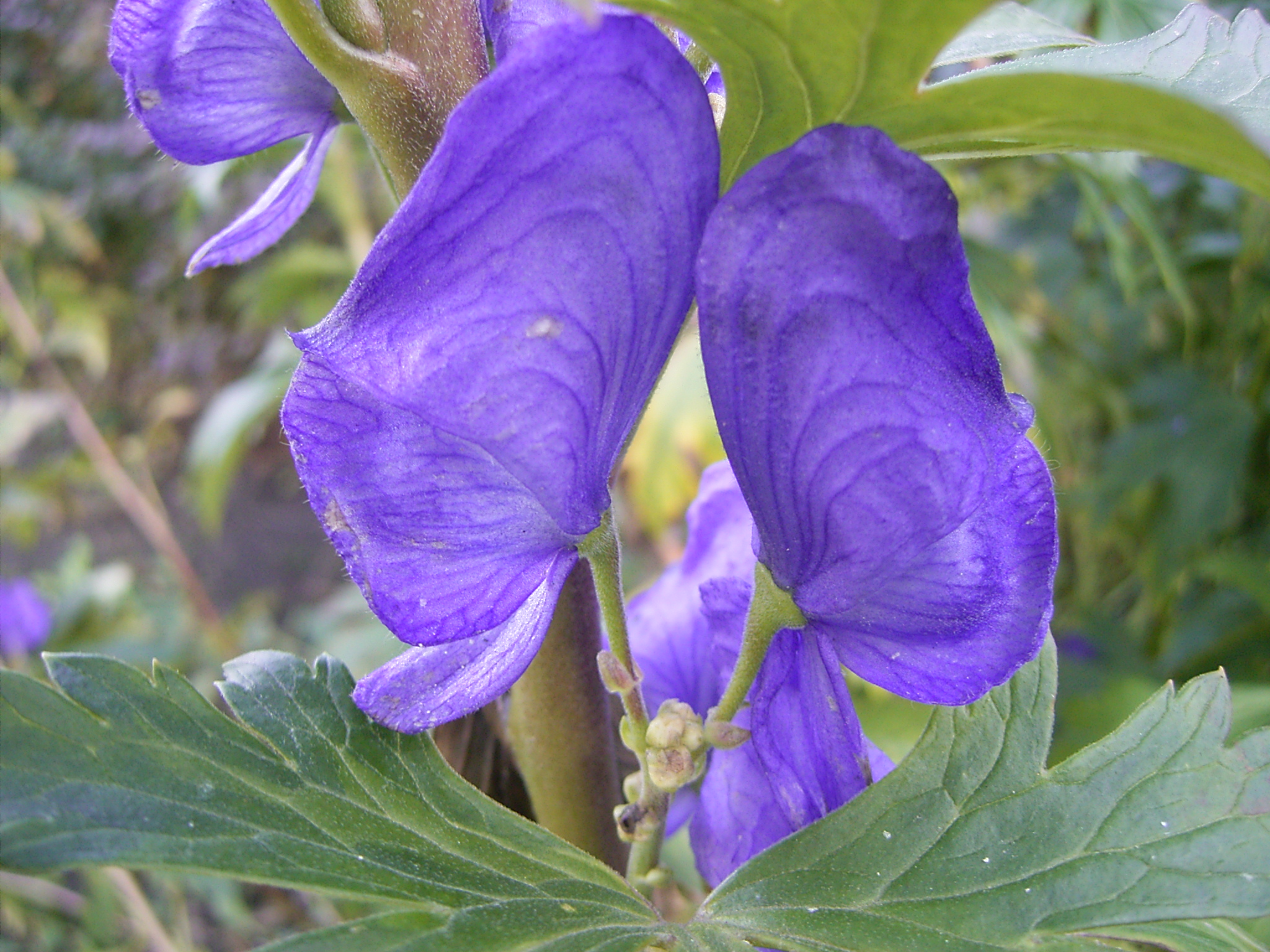

Scientific classification
- Kingdom: Plantae
- Clade: Tracheophytes
- Clade: Angiosperms
- Clade: Eudicots
- Order: Ranunculales
- Family: Ranunculaceae
- Genus: Aconitum
- Species: A. carmichaelii

Binomial name
- Aconitum carmichaelii Debeaux

Synonyms
- Aconitum chinense Paxton [= Aconitum carmichaelii var. truppelianum]; Aconitum japonicum var. truppelianum Ulbr. [≡ Aconitum carmichaelii var. truppelianum]

= Aconitum carmichaelii =

Species of plant

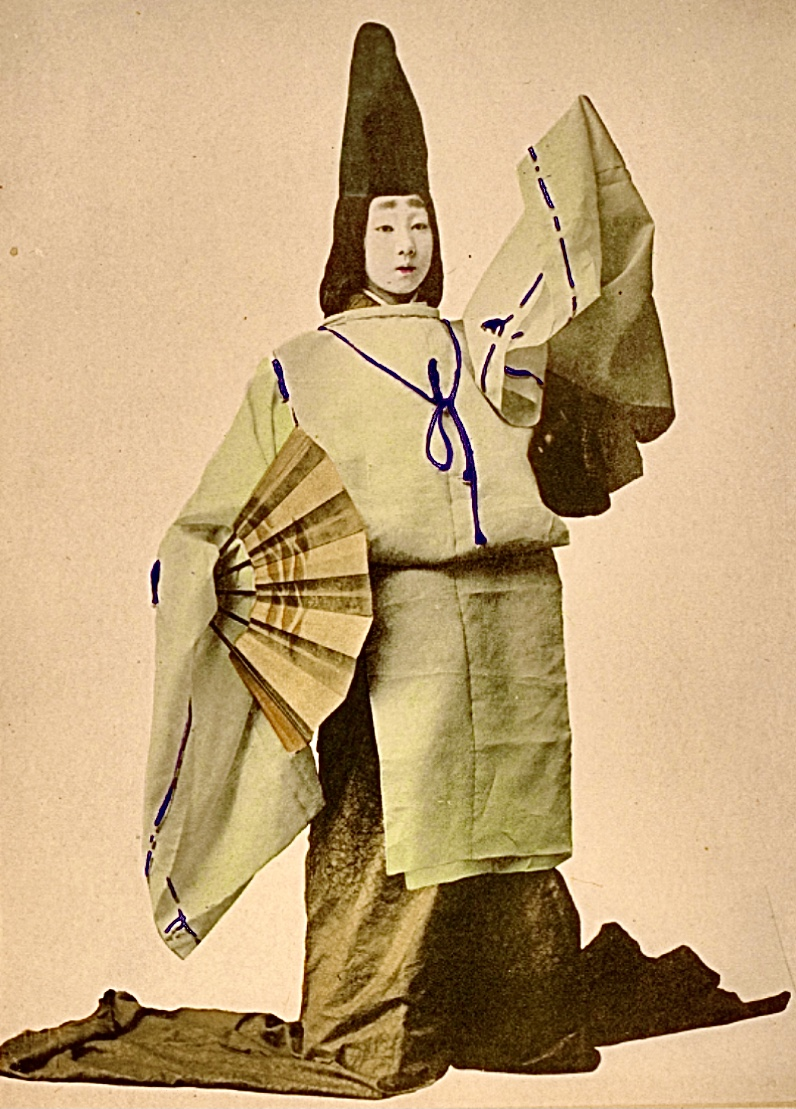
A miko (dressed for the Kagura dance), wearing a tall torikabuto headdress - after which the cowl-like flower of Aconitum carmichaelii is named in Japanese

Aconitum carmichaelii is a species of flowering plant of the genus Aconitum, family Ranunculaceae. It is native to China and northern Vietnam in East Asia. It is commonly known as Chinese aconite, Carmichael's monkshood or Chinese wolfsbane. In Mandarin Chinese, it is known as fùzǐ (附子; meaning daughter root, or lateral root) and as wūtóu (烏頭; lit. "black head", referring to tuberous mother root, or root tuber); while in Japanese it is named torikabuto (鳥兜; (literally "bird-hat") after a type of ceremonial phoenix headdress, worn during the shamanic Kagura dance of the miko).

== Description ==
Growing to 1.2 metres (4 ft) tall by 30 centimetres (12 in) wide, it is an erect perennial, with 3- to 5-lobed ovate, leathery leaves. Dense panicles of blue flowers are produced in late summer and autumn.

It is valued as a garden plant, and numerous cultivars have been developed, of which 'Arendsii' and 'Kelmscott' (Wilsonii Group) have gained the Royal Horticultural Society's Award of Garden Merit. This plant is sometimes mislabeled as the summer-flowering Aconitum fischeri in the horticultural industry.

== Biological effects ==
All parts of this plant are extremely toxic, and it has historically been used as a poison on arrows. If not prepared properly by a trained person, Aconitum can be deadly when taken internally.

=== Toxicology ===
Marked symptoms may appear almost immediately, usually not later than one hour, and "with large doses death is almost instantaneous." Death usually occurs within two to six hours in fatal poisoning (20 to 40 mL of tincture may prove fatal). The initial signs are gastrointestinal including nausea, vomiting, and diarrhea. This is followed by a sensation of burning, tingling, and numbness in the mouth and face, and of burning in the abdomen. In severe poisonings pronounced motor weakness occurs and cutaneous sensations of tingling and numbness spread to the limbs. Cardiovascular features include hypotension, sinus bradycardia, and ventricular arrhythmias. Other features may include sweating, dizziness, difficulty in breathing, headache, and confusion. The main causes of death are ventricular arrhythmias and asystole, paralysis of the heart or of the respiratory center. The only post-mortem signs are those of asphyxia.

Treatment of poisoning is mainly supportive. All patients require close monitoring of blood pressure and cardiac rhythm. Gastrointestinal decontamination with activated charcoal can be used if given within one hour of ingestion. The major physiological antidote is atropine, which is used to treat bradycardia. Other drugs used for ventricular arrhythmia include lidocaine, amiodarone, bretylium, flecainide, procainamide, and mexiletine. Cardiopulmonary bypass is used if symptoms are refractory to treatment with these drugs. Successful use of charcoal hemoperfusion has been claimed in patients with severe aconite poisoning.

Poisoning may also occur following picking the leaves without wearing gloves; the aconitine toxin is absorbed easily through the skin. In this event, there will be no gastrointestinal effects. Tingling will start at the point of absorption and extend up the arm to the shoulder, after which the heart will start to be affected. The tingling will be followed by unpleasant numbness. Treatment is similar to poisoning caused by oral ingestion.

Aconitine is a potent neurotoxin that opens tetrodotoxin-sensitive sodium channels. It increases influx of sodium through these channels and delays repolarization, thus increasing excitability and promoting ventricular dysrhythmias.

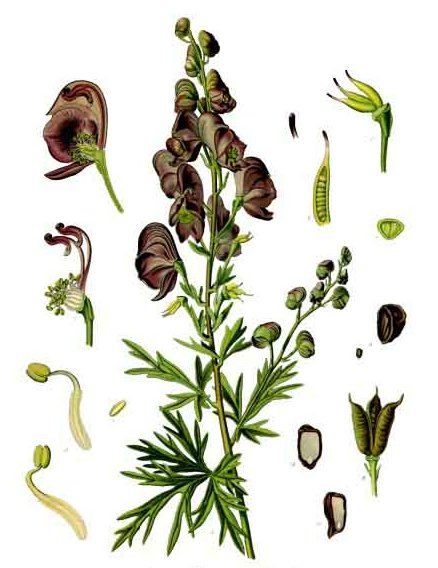
19th-century illustration

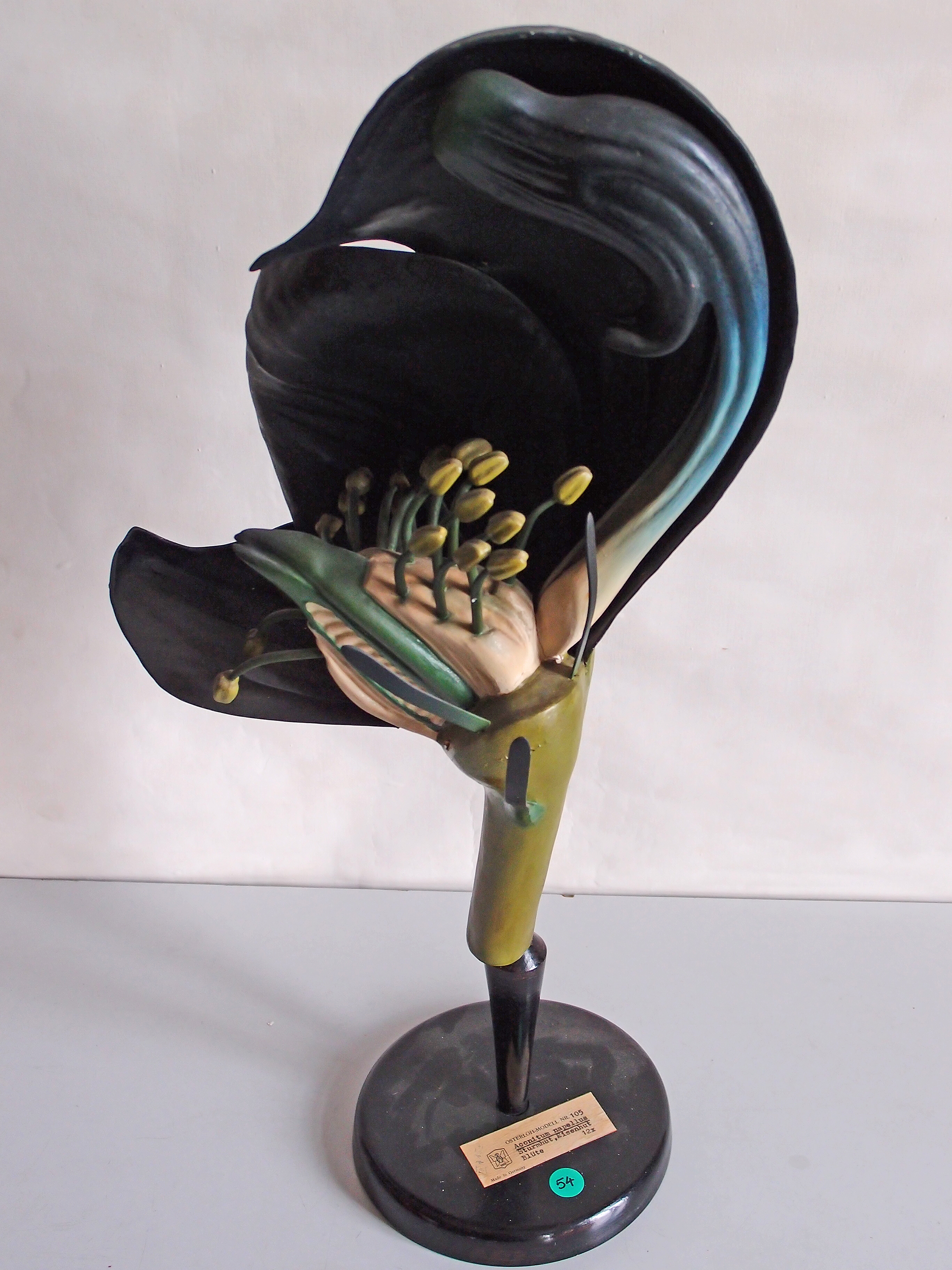
Model, Botanical Museum Greifswald

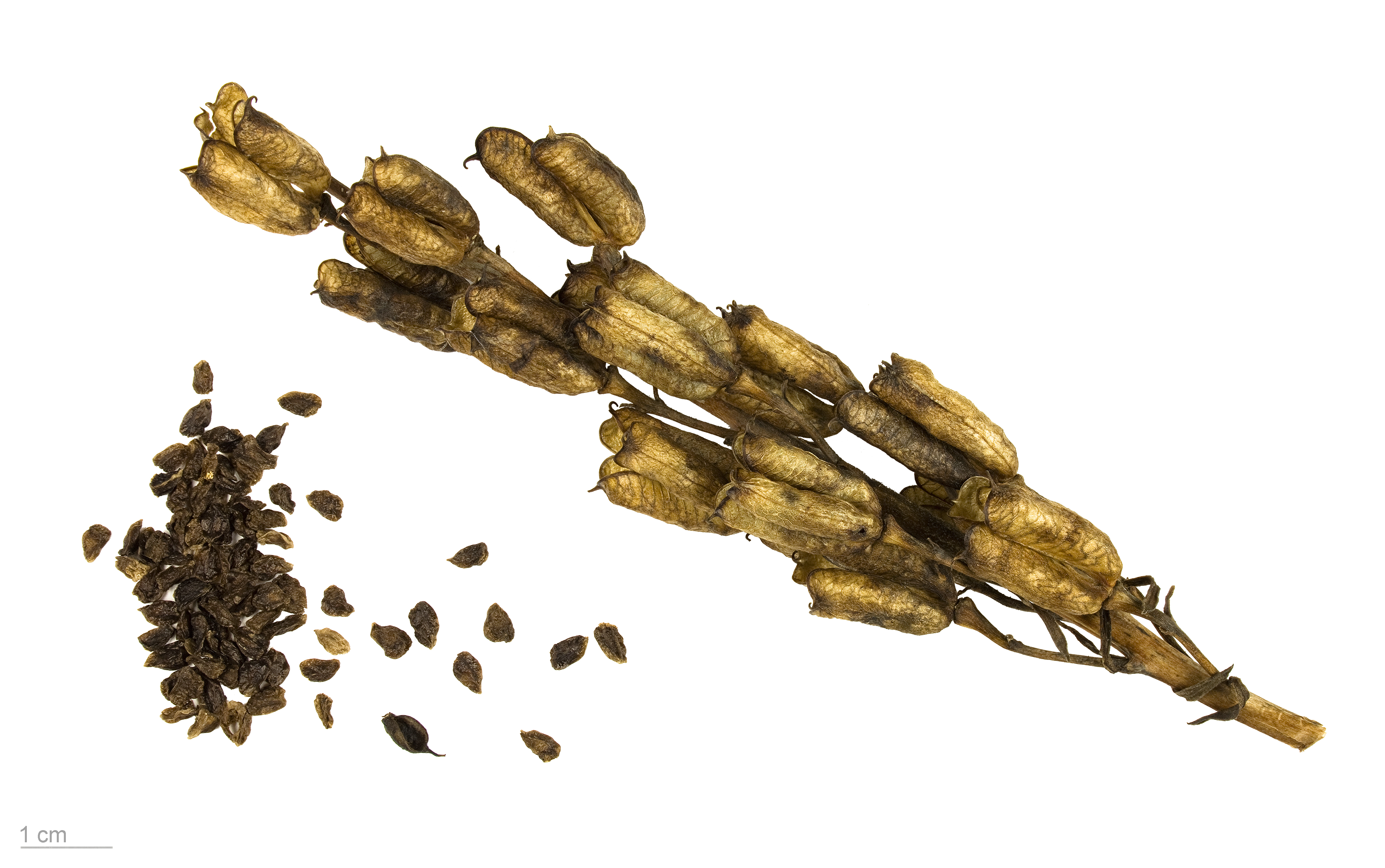
Aconitum napellus - MHNT

== Traditional medicine ==
The root of Aconitum carmichaelii is used in traditional Chinese medicine.

== Chemical constituents ==
- Aconitine: Raw Fu Zi, 0.004%; prepared Fu Zi, trace/none.
- Hypaconitine: Raw Fu Zi, 0.12%; prepared Fu Zi, 0.001%
- Mesaconitine: Raw Fu Zi, 0.033%; prepared Fu Zi, 0.001%

The LD_{50} of aconitine in mice was 0.295 mg/kg SI, and that of the prepared decoction is 17.42 g/k. A lethal dose of aconitine is 3–4 mg.

Violdelphin is an anthocyanin, a type of plant pigment, found in the purplish blue flower of A. chinense.
