= Union of Research Professionals of Jyväskylä =

The Union of Research Professionals of Jyväskylä
- Abbreviation: Jytte
- Formation: 1967
- Type: Trade union
- Headquarters: Jyväskylä, Finland
- Chairperson: Pekka Pietilä
- Website: Official website

The Union of Research Professionals of Jyväskylä (Jytte) is a trade union association representing researchers, scientists and higher education teaching staff in Central Finland. It is a local member association of the Union of Research Proffesionals, which is affiliated with Akava. According to its website, the association had approximately 800 members as of September 2026.

Pekka Pietilä has served as chairperson of Jytte since 2025.

== Objectives ==
The association represents its members' interests concerning salaries, employment rights and social benefits at the University of Jyväskylä and its affiliated research and teaching institutions. Its activities include negotiating on behalf of its members and participating in university working groups concerned with occupational health and safety, equality and remuneration. The association's elected workplace representatives represent members, monitor compliance with employment agreements and act as intermediaries between employees and the employer.

== History ==
Jytte's origins lie in the organisation of teaching and research assistants at the University of Jyväskylä during the 1960s. In 1967, the university's association of assistants joined the newly established Union of Higher Education Assistants (Korkeakoulujen Assistenttiliitto), which later became the Union of Research Proffesionals.
