= Academic Engineers and Architects in Finland TEK =

Trade union of Finland

- Tekniikan Akateemisten Liitto TEK
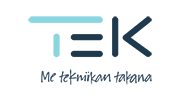
- Founded: 1896
- Headquarters: Helsinki, Finland
- Members: approx. 81,000 (2025)
- Key people: Arto Timperi, president
- Affiliations: AKAVA, FEANI, numerous others
- Website: tek.fi/en

Academic Engineers and Architects in Finland TEK (Finnish: Tekniikan akateemiset TEK, Swedish: Teknikens Akademikerförbund) is a Finnish trade union of university-educated engineers, architects and scientists. In addition, TEK is a learned society and the professional body of the engineering profession. The union requires that its full members have a master's degree or equivalent in engineering, architecture, mathematics, physics or in other sciences related to technology.

== History ==
TEK was founded in 1896 as the association of Finnish-speaking engineering professionals (Suomenkielisten Teknikkojen Seura). In early years, it was mainly a learned society, which aimed to promote the use of Finnish language in the engineering profession dominated by the Swedish language. During the World War I, the activities of the association widened into wider sphere of Engineering and Economics. In 1936, the association differentiated itself from the engineers and technicians who had graduated from polytechnics, and started to require a master's degree in engineering (Finnish: diplomi-insinööri) of its members. This was signalled also in the name Suomen Teknillinen Seura (Finnish technological society), which excluded technicians.

The World War II brought about inflation which severely affected the middle classes earning fixed salaries. Little by little, the association increased its activities as the lobbying body of the engineering profession, starting to offer continuing education and pursuing studies on the social and economic standing of its membership. In 1972, the Finnish-speaking STS and its Swedish-speaking counterpart Tekniska föreningen i Finland (TFiF) formed a common trade union KAL, which started to negotiate collectively with the employers as a full-scale trade union. In 1978, KAL started to insure its members against unemployment and in 1984, the Finnish Association of Mathematicians and Physicists (SMFL) gave KAL a mandate to negotiate on its behalf.

The present structure of the association was formed in 1993, as KAL and STS, which had been in close cooperation for two decades, converged into TEK. At the same time, the Swedish-speaking TFiF and the SMFL remained separate, although all members of the SMFL are automatically also members of TEK.

== Activities ==
The TEK has delegated its right to negotiate collectively to two organizations. In the public sector, the JUKO (Educated employees of the public sector) negotiates collectively for all university-level employees in municipalities, the state and at the universities. In the private sector, the YTN (Negotiating organization of the upper-level salaried employees) is the body responsible for the collective agreements of university-educated staff. Although rather moderate in its bargaining, the YTN went to strike in 2007 when the collective negotiations in the industrial design bureau branch broke up. The strike included some 6,000 engineers and scientists and lasted 11 days, resulting in a slightly better collective agreement than had been offered earlier by the employers.

As the learned society of engineering profession, TEK engages in public discussion on the technology, engineering education and research. This contribution is supported by the studies conducted by its staff. In particular, TEK supports active state participation in and financing of the R&D activities. One of the most visible single activity of TEK was the annual Finnish Engineering Award (Finnish: Suomalainen insinöörityöpalkinto) which was awarded to an outstanding achievement of original engineering or architectural work until 2022. As the main body of the engineering profession of Finland, TEK has since 1966 published the Engineer's rule of honour, the ethical guidelines of engineering profession. The latest edition of the rule is from 2018.

For its members, the TEK offers the usual services provided by Finnish trade union: legal, salary and career services.
