= Association for Machines and Mechanisms =

Association for Machines and Mechanism, India is the Indian national affiliate of the International Federation for the Promotion of Mechanism and Machine Science, IFToMM. The main objective of AMM is to contribute to mechanical design at all levels starting from academic projects to industrial production, thus enhancing the quality and the reliability of indigenous machines. AMM organizes the National Conference on Machines and Mechanisms (NaCoMM) and the workshop on Industrial Problems on Machines and Mechanisms (IPRoMM) regularly.

== Conferences and Workshops ==
1. National Conference on Machines and Mechanisms (NaCoMM): NaCoMM Conferences lay emphasis on theoretical aspects and experimental studies relating to machinery. The first NaCoMM Conference, NaCoMM 81 was held at IIT Bombay in 1981. NaCoMM covers a wide range of topics including kinematics and dynamics of machines, robotics and automation, CAD, automobile engineering, rotor dynamics and tribology, vibration of machines, condition monitoring and failure analysis, man-machine systems and mechatronices, micro-mechanisms and control systems. The upcoming NaCoMM conference will be held at NIT Durgapur, India on December 17–18, 2009.

2. Industrial Problems on Machines and Mechanisms (IPRoMM): IPRoMM essentially concentrates on industrial problems and practical solutions to the design of machines in specific areas. The workshops held so far have covered textile, mechanical handling agricultural machinery and home appliances. The latest IPRoMM covers precision instruments and micro–mechanisms. The first IPRoMM, IPRoMM 86, was held in December 1986 at ATIRA in Ahmedabad.

3. AMM Workshop on Design of Mechanisms for Solving Real Life Problems: The workshop aims at giving the participant an opportunity to discuss the design issues for a host of advanced concepts in rigid and compliant mechanisms with the recognized experts in the field and explore the possibilities of collaborative work. The upcoming AMM workshop on the design on mechanisms will be held at IIT Madras, India on October 23–25, 2008.

== Other Activities ==
One prominent activity of AMM is the organization of the best design project contest for students. The hosts of a Conference invite students to submit papers based on their B.E/M.E/B.Tech/M.Tech. projects and present awards to the best design projects. Two such contests have been conducted so far, one in Mumbai (NaCoMM 87) and one in Nagpur (IPRoMM 89).

== List of AMM Calendar Activities ==
1. NaCoMM 81, IIT Bombay, December 1981
2. 6th IFToMM, IIT Delhi, December 1983,
3. NaCoMM 85, February 1985, IISc Bangalore
4. IPRoMM 86, December 1986, ATIRA, Ahmedabad
5. IPRoMM 87, December 1987, VJTI, Bombay
6. IPRoMM 89, January 1989, VRCE, Nagpur
7. NaCoMM 90, March 1990, IIT Roorkee
8. NaCoMM 91, December 1991, IIT Madras
9. IPRoMM 92, February 1992, PSG College of Technology, Coimbatore
10. NaCoMM 93, December 1993, IIT Kharagpur
11. IPRoMM 95, February 1995, BMS College of Engineering, Bangalore
12. NaCoMM 96, January 1996, CMERI, Durgapur
13. NaCoMM 97, December 1997, IIT Kanpur
14. NaCoMM 99, December 1999, IIT Bombay
15. NaCoMM 2001, December 2001, IIT Kharagpur
16. IPRoMM 2003, February 2003, VIT, Vellore
17. NaCoMM 2003, December 2003, IIT Delhi
18. DTDM 2004, December 2004, IIT Madras
19. NaCoMM 2005, December 2005, IIT Guwahati
20. IPRoMM 2005, Feb 2005, IIT Kharagpur
21. PCEA IFToMM 2006, Recent Trends in Automation, Priyadarshini College of Engg & Architecture, Nagpur
22. Team Tech 2006, August 2006 Symp Micro & Nano Fabrication
23. IPRoMM 2007, Jan 2007, Kumaragur College of Tech
24. iCAMDIA 2007, Int Conf Adv in Machine Design & Ind Auto, College of Engg Pune
25. NaCoMM 2007, IISc Bangalore.
26. NaCoMM2009, NIT Durgapur.
