= Ivan Artobolevsky =

Soviet scientist and engineer (1905–1977)

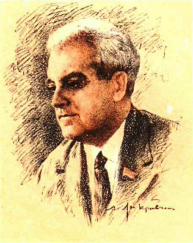

Ivan Ivanovich Artobolevsky (Russian: Ива́н Ива́нович Артоболе́вский; September 26 (9 October), 1905, Moscow, Russian Empire – 21 September 1977, Moscow, Soviet Union) was a Soviet scientist and engineer, academic of the Academy of Sciences of the Soviet Union, and Hero of Socialist Labour.

== Biography ==
Artobolevsky was born into a clerical family in 1905. In 1938, at the time of the Great Purge, his father was shot. In 1926, he graduated from the Moscow Agricultural Academy Timiryazev. In 1927, he graduated from the Physics and Mathematics Faculty of Moscow State University, and afterwards worked in teaching. Between 1932 and 1949 he was a professor at Moscow State University, first working in the Department of Theoretical Mechanics. In 1941, with Boris Bulgakov, Artobolevsky established the Department of Applied Mechanics, and served as its head from 1941 to 1944. From 1937, he also worked at the Institute of Mechanical Engineering, and from 1942 was also a professor at the Moscow Aviation Institute.

In 1939, Artobolevsky was elected a corresponding member of the Academy of Sciences of the Soviet Union, and in 1946 became a full member.

During World War II, he was chairman of the All-Union Scientific Society of Mechanical Engineers (VNITOMASh).

Since 1947 - Deputy Chairman of the All-Union Society "Knowledge", in 1966 - Chairman of the All-Union Society "Knowledge". Deputy of the Supreme Soviet of the USSR 7th-9th convocation.

== Honors and awards ==
- 1969 - Hero of Socialist Labour.
- 1945 - Honored Scientist of the RSFSR.
- 1946 - Prize of Chebyshev.
- 1959 - World Peace Council awarded the silver medal of the Joliot-Curie.
- 1966 - Czechoslovak Academy of Sciences awarded the silver medal "For merits in development of science and society."
- 1967 - Institution of Mechanical Engineers awarded the James Watt International Gold Medal.

He also was awarded the Order of Lenin (1954, 1965, 1967, 1969), two Orders of the Red Banner of Labour (1945), as well as medals "For the Defense of Moscow (1944)," For heroic trud. V commemorate the 100th anniversary of Lenin (1970), "Thirty Years of Victory in the Great Patriotic War of 1941-1945." (1975)

== Scientific Activities ==
Was a founder of the IFToMM - International Federation for the Promotion of Mechanism and Machine Science.

=== Research interests ===
Theory of machines and mechanisms problems of theoretical and experimental methods for studying the dynamics of working machines.

=== Scientific results ===
Developed a classification of spatial mechanisms and gave methods for kinematic analysis created methods of kinematic analysis of complex multi-tier mechanism (1939).

== Sources ==
- The site of war heroes
- Media related to Ivan Ivanovich Artobolevskiy at Wikimedia Commons
