= Federation of Public and Private Sector Employees =

Trade union of Finland

- Ammattiliitto Jyty
- Formation: 1918; 108 years ago
- Type: Trade union
- Headquarters: Helsinki
- Chairperson: Jonna Voima

The Federation of Public and Private Sector Employees (Finnish: Julkis- ja yksityisalojen toimihenkilöliitto, Jyty) is a trade union representing local government workers in Finland.

The union was founded in 1918, and it became known as the Federation of Municipal Officials. It affiliated to the Confederation of Salaried Employees (TVK), but the TVK went bankrupt in 1992, and the union transferred to the Finnish Confederation of Professionals. By 1998, it had 75,500 members.

In 2004, after two small unions representing adult education workers merged in, the union renamed itself as the "Federation of Public and Private Sector Employees".

== Presidents ==
1919: Harald Dalström
1920: Zachris Castren
1938: Knut Furuhjelm
1944: Alex Danielson
1946: Akseli Linnavuori
1950: Eero Rönkä
1967: Urpo Ryönänkoski
1973: Juhani Tuominen
1973: Henrik Boehm
1976: Taisto Mursula
1993: Katriina Perkka-Jortikka
2001: Markku Jalonen
2006: Merja Ailus
2010: Maija Pihlajamäki
