= Union of Salaried Employees =

Trade union of Finland

- Union of Salaried Employees
- Toimihenkilöunioni; Tjänstemannaunionen
- Merged into: Trade Union Pro
- Founded: May 2001
- Dissolved: 2011
- Headquarters: Helsinki, Finland
- Location: Finland
- Members: 125,000
- Affiliations: STTK
- Website: www.toimihenkilounioni.fi

The Union of Salaried Employees (TU, Finnish: Toimihenkilöunioni, Swedish: Tjänstemannaunionen) was a trade union in Finland. With 125,000 members, TU was a major trade union for workers in industry and industrial services, technics, economy and information.

The union was established in 2001, when the Union of Technical Employees merged with the Finnish Industrial and Clerical Employees' Union, the Construction and Engineering Union, and the Swedish Union of Technicians and Foremen. Like all its predecessors, it affiliated to the Finnish Confederation of Salaried Employees (STTK). On formation, the union had 130,000 members, making it STTK's largest affiliate, and the fourth-largest union in Finland.

In 2011, the union merged with the Trade Union Direct, to form Trade Union Pro.

== Presidents ==
2001: Ilkka Joenpalo
2005: Antti Rinne
