= AMM =

Amm or AMM may refer to:

== Entertainment ==
=== Music ===
- AMM (group), British free improvisation group
- AMM Allstars, see Association of Musical Marxists, (group)

=== Television ===
- Amy's Mythic Mornings, an educational show on APTN Kids

=== Video games ===
- Automated MatchMaking, in the context of the Warcraft III Ladder system

== Finance ==
- Automated Market Maker, a term in Decentralized finance

== Organizations ==
- Association for Machines and Mechanisms
- Aceh Monitoring Mission

== Museum ==
- Museum of Anatolian Civilizations (Anadolu Medeniyetleri Müzesi), a museum in Ankara, Turkey

== Publications ==
- American Mathematical Monthly, a mathematics journal
- American Metal Market, a metals and mining trade publication

== Religion ==
- Ahmadiyya Muslim Mission, for the Ahmadiyya sect in Islam
- 'Amm (god), a Qatabanian moon god

== Science, technology, and medicine ==
- Advanced Metering Management
- Agnogenic myeloid metaplasia, a disease of the bone marrow
- Air Mass Meter; see mass flow sensor
- α-Methylmescaline, also known as 3,4,5-trimethoxyamphetamine (TMA)
- Automatic Memory management
- Automatic Memory Management of an Oracle Database System Global Area

== Transportation ==
- Amherst (Amtrak station) in Massachusetts (3-letter code AMM)
- The IATA Code for Queen Alia International Airport, Amman, Jordan
- Aircraft maintenance manual, or airplane maintenance manual

== Other uses ==
- Aviation Machinist's Mate, a rank of the U.S. Navy
