= Mam =

Mam or MAM may refer to:

== Places ==
- An Mám or Maum, a settlement in Ireland
- General Servando Canales International Airport in Matamoros, Tamaulipas, Mexico (IATA Code: MAM)
- Isle of Mam, a phantom island
- Mam Tor, a hill near Castleton in the High Peak of Derbyshire, England

== Cultures ==
- Mam people, an indigenous Maya people in Guatemala
  - Mam language, a Mayan language spoken in Guatemala

== People ==
- Michèle Alliot-Marie (or MAM, born 1946), French Minister of Foreign Affairs
- Mam Jokmok, Thai comedian
- Somaly Mam (born 1970s), anti-trafficking advocate who founded the Somaly Mam Foundation

== Arts, entertainment, and media ==
- Mam (film), a 2010 British short film
- Mam and Zin (1692), a Kurdish classic love story
- MAM Records, a record label

== Computing and technology ==
- Media asset management, of digital media
- Media Auxiliary Memory
- Mobile application management

== Museums ==
- Macau Museum of Art, China
- Museo de Arte Moderno, Mexico
- Miami Art Museum. US
- Midland Air Museum, Warwickshire, England
- Milwaukee Art Museum, US
- Montclair Art Museum, New Jersey, U.S.
- Montreal Aviation Museum, Canada

== Protests ==
- Movement Against the Monarchy, UK

== Science and healthcare ==
- 6-Monoacetylmorphine or 6-MAM, a metabolite of heroin
- Medicine-assisted manipulation in medicine
- Methylazoxymethanol, a carcinogen
- Methylazoxymethanol acetate, a neurotoxin
- Mitochondria associated membranes, regions of the endoplasmic reticulum in cells
- MAM (drug), a psychedelic-related chemical compound

== Other uses ==
- Mam, term for mother in some English-speaking regions
  - Welsh Mam
  - Geordie
- Mam/Mắm, in Cambodian cuisine, a fermented fish preparation
  - Mắm nêm, a type of Vietnamese fish sauce with Mắm meaning anything fermented
    - Mắm (restaurant) A Vietnamese restaurant in NYC named after said product
- Maximum authorised mass of a road vehicle
- MAM (Smart Micro Munition), a laser-guided smart munition system produced by Turkish manufacturer ROKETSAN
- Military-age male, a term used to refer to men at ages where they are generally capable of military service.

== See also ==
- Ma'am
- "Mam'selle"
