= Union of Private Sector Professionals =

Trade union of Finland

The Union of Private Sector Professionals (Finnish: Toimihenkilöliitto, Erto; formerly Federation of Special Service and Clerical Employees, Erityisalojen Toimihenkilöliitto) is a trade union representing a variety of private sector professionals.

The federation was founded in 1968, as the General Staff Union, and was affiliated to the Confederation of Salaried Employees (TVK). The TVK went bankrupt in 1992, and the union transferred to the Finnish Confederation of Professionals. By 1998, it had about 20,000 members.

All members of the federation belong to one of its six affiliated unions:

- Accounting Professionals
- Digital Media, Marketing Communications and Information Professionals
- Finnish Optometrists' Union
- ET Specialists
- Logistics Agents' Union
- Private Social and Health Care Professionals

== Presidents ==
1970: Matti Hellsten
2002: Antti Rinne
2005: Tapio Huttula
2011: Juri Aaltonen
