= Canadian Committee for the Theory of Machines and Mechanisms =

Organization

- Abbreviation: CCToMM
- Formation: September 1971
- Type: NGO
- Legal status: Not for profit
- Purpose: Professional Cooperation
- Region served: Canada
- Official language: English and French
- Chair: Scott B. Nokleby
- Affiliations: IFToMM
- Website: www.cctomm.ca

The Canadian Committee for the Theory of Machines and Mechanisms (CCToMM) is the Canadian branch of the International Federation for the Promotion of Mechanism and Machine Science (IFToMM). As with IFToMM, CCToMM is an organization that supports the exchange of researchers and engineers from a wide range of disciplines related to Mechanical Engineering.

== Mission ==
To promote research and development in the field of Machines and Mechanisms by theoretical and experimental methods, along with their practical application.

== History ==
Since its inception in 1971, CCToMM has grown to become an important part of the fabric of Canadian research in the theory of mechanisms and machines (TMM). CCToMM was founded by M.O.M. Osman, Professor of mechanical engineering at Concordia University in Montreal. The committee was fully formed and operating on time for the ASME DETC 1976, which took place in Montreal. CCToMM became affiliated with IFToMM in 1979 and has been a regular member organisation since.

CCToMM has served the Canadian TMM community in both Canadian official languages. For example, presentations at CCToMM symposia are welcome in both the French and English languages.

The succession of CCToMM Chairs is as follows:

- Professor M.O.M. Osman (1971-1992), Concordia University;
- Professor Jorge Angeles (1992-1996), McGill University;
- Professor Louis Cloutier (1996-1999), Université Laval;
- Dr. Jean-Claude Piedboeuf (1999-2003), Canadian Space Agency;
- Professor Ronald Podhorodeski (2003-2011) University of Victoria;
- Professor M. John D. Hayes (2011-2019) Carleton University;
- Professor Scott B. Nokleby (since 2019) Ontario Tech University.

== Meetings and events ==
- CCToMM Annual General Meeting - once a year
- CCToMM Mechanisms, Machines, and Mechatronics Symposium (CCToMM M³ Symposium) - every odd year since 1999

The CCToMM M³ Symposium is a single-track conference covering subjects in the areas of Mechanisms, Machines and Mechatronics, thus its name CCToMM M³. During even-numbered years until 2016, the symposium was held within the CSME Congress (formerly known as the CSME Forum) while in odd-numbered years, the symposium is organised as a stand-alone event most often held in Ontario and Quebec. In 2022 CCToMM formed an alliance with the American Committee, known as USCToMM, whereby in even numbered years members of CCToMM are invited to participate in the USCToMM Symposium on Mechanical Systems and Robotics (MSR), while in odd numbered years members of USCToMM are invited to participate in the CCToMM M³ Symposium.

== See also ==
- International Federation for the Promotion of Mechanism and Machine Science
