= MMAS =

MMAS may refer to:

- Lic. Jesús Terán Peredo International Airport, airport in Mexico with ICAO code MMAS
- Master of Military Art and Science, degree awarded by the U.S. School of Advanced Military Studies
- Master of Mobile Application Security, see List of professional designations in the United States
- Matt Morgan Appreciation Society, fan club of wrestler Matt Morgan
- Make Me a Supermodel (Australian TV series)
- Max-Min Ant System, a type of Ant colony optimization algorithm, see Ant colony optimization algorithms#Max-Min Ant System (MMAS)

== See also ==
- MMA (disambiguation), for the singular of MMAs
- MAS (disambiguation)
