= Trade Union Pro =

Trade union of Finland

- Ammattiliitto Pro
- Formation: 2011; 15 years ago
- Type: Trade union
- Headquarters: Helsinki
- President: Niko Simola

Trade Union Pro (Finnish: Ammattiliitto Pro) is a collective force of working life and one of the largest trade unions in Finland. Pro's members are educated professionals, experts and managers in a wide array of sectors from finance to ICT and communications, service fields and industries to the public sector. Pro has some 120 000 members and negotiates 150 collective agreements.

Pro's mission is to improve the working conditions, livelihoods and career prospects of our members and those studying these fields. The union also looks after the well-being of its members.

Trade Union Pro believes that a humane working life is a human right. The union foresees international developments and phenomena and develops new solutions for the Finnish working life.

== History ==
The union was founded in 2011, when the Trade Union Direct merged with the Union of Salaried Employees. Like its predecessors, the union is under the Finnish Confederation of Professionals (STTK).

On formation, the union was led by Antti Rinne. He stood down in 2014, and was succeeded by Jorma Malinen. In 2019, the Confederation of State Employees' Unions – Pardia merged into Pro, totaling the member count to about 120,000. In 2021, the Union of Insurance Employees also merged with Pro.
