= Bank Employees' Union (Finland) =

Trade union of Finland

The Bank Employees' Union (Finnish: Pankkitoimihenkilöliitto) was a trade union representing workers in the banking industry in Finland.

The union was founded in 1968, when the Bankers' Union merged with the Savings Bank Employees' Union. It affiliated to Confederation of Salaried Employees (TVK). The TVK went bankrupt in 1992, and the union transferred to the Finnish Confederation of Professionals. By 1998, it had 39,300 members.

In 1998, the union changed its name to Trade Union Direct. The Federation of Employees in state-owned enterprises merged into the union in 1999. In 2011, the union merged with the Union of Salaried Employees, to form Trade Union Pro.
