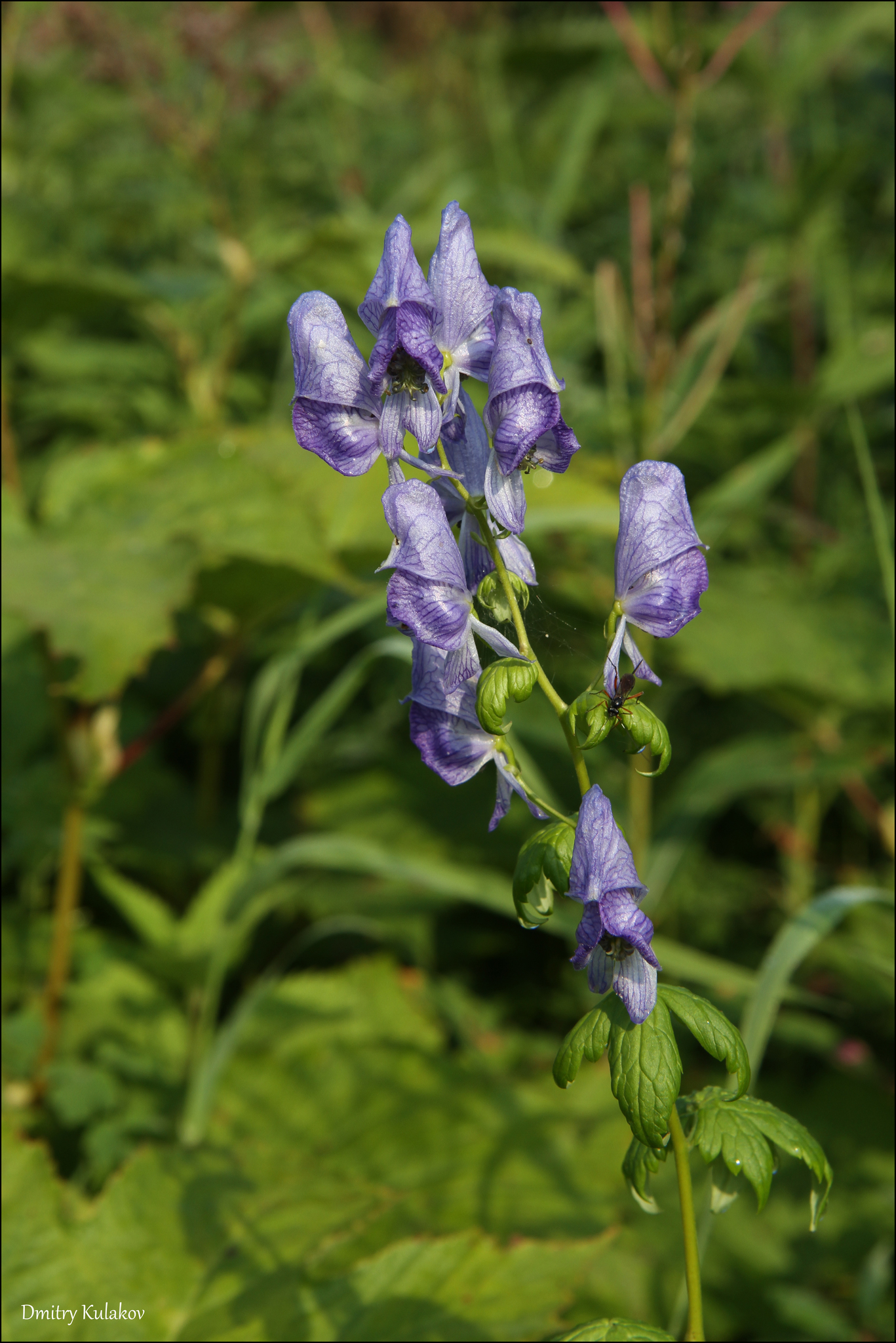

Scientific classification
- Kingdom: Plantae
- Clade: Embryophytes
- Clade: Tracheophytes
- Clade: Spermatophytes
- Clade: Angiosperms
- Clade: Eudicots
- Order: Ranunculales
- Family: Ranunculaceae
- Genus: Aconitum
- Species: A. fischeri

Binomial name
- Aconitum fischeri L.

= Aconitum fischeri =

Species of flowering plant

Aconitum fischeri is a species of flowering plant of the genus Aconitum, in the buttercup family, Ranunculaceae. It is native to forests, grasslands, and hilly slopes in the Chinese provinces of Heilongjiang and Jilin, and in Korea and Siberia. It blooms in late summer. The plant contains poisonous aconitine, but according to ancient Chinese medical lore, if it is carefully measured, prepared, and used, it is believed to be beneficial in the treatment of colds, coughs, and fevers. If the measuring is in the slightest degree inaccurate, however, it is pure poison. The plant is susceptible to downy mildew caused by the oomycete species Peronospora aconiti. The name Aconitum fischeri is sometimes incorrectly used in the horticultural industry to refer to Aconitum carmichaelii, which blooms in autumn.
