= Finnish Confederation of Professionals =

STTK
- Finnish Confederation of Professionals
- Toimihenkilökeskusjärjestö; Tjänstemannacentralorganisationen
- Founded: 1946; 1993
- Headquarters: Mikonkatu 8 A Helsinki, Finland
- Location: Finland
- Members: 650,000
- Key people: Antti Palola, president
- Affiliations: ITUC, NFS, ETUC, TUAC
- Website: www.sttk.fi

The Finnish Confederation of Professionals (STTK) (Finnish: Toimihenkilökeskusjärjestö, Swedish: Tjänstemannacentralorganisationen) is a trade union confederation in Finland. It has a membership of 650,000 and represents salaried employees in Finland.

== History ==
The STTK was founded in 1946, to represent STTK's counterparts are the Central Organisation of Finnish Trade Unions (SAK) and the Confederation of Unions for Academic Professionals in Finland (AKAVA).

The STTK got its current form in 1993 when most of the unions affiliated with the bankrupt Confederation of Salaried Employees joined the original STTK, founded in 1946.

== Member unions ==
=== Current ===
Affiliates in March 2020 were:

Union	Abbreviation	Founded	Affiliated
Association of Finnish Construction Engineers and Architects	RIA	1951	
Business Administration Union	LTA	1949	1994
Federation of Public and Private Sector Employees	Jyty	1918	1993
Federation of Special Service and Clerical Employees	Erto	1968	1993
Finnish Association of Fire Fighters	SPAL		
Finnish Engineers' Association	SKL		
Finnish Ships' Officers' Union	SLPL	1905	1972
Finnish Union of Practical Nurses	SuPer	1948	1993
Professional Dairy Association	MVL	1945	1972
Trade Union Pro	Pro	2011	2011
Trade Union Unio	Unio	2018	2018
Union of Church Employees in Finland		1957	
Union of Finnish Foresters	METO	1977	
Union of Health and Social Care Professionals	Tehy	1982	1993
Union of Insurance Employees	VvL	1945	1993

=== Former ===
- Association of Finnish Harbour Foremen
- Association of Foremen and Technical Functionaries
- Confederation of State Employees' Unions – Pardia
- Federation of Swedish Technicians in Finland
- Finnish Engineer Officers' Union
- Finnish Federation of Technicians in Special Branches SETELI
- Finnish Police Union
- Postal Officers' Union
- Union of Sales and Marketing Professionals
- Technical Functionaries of Communes
- Trade Union Direct
- Trade Union Nousu
- Union of Salaried Employees
