= Finnish Police Union =

Trade union of Finland

The Finnish Police Union (Finnish: Suomen Poliisijärjestöjen Liitto, SPJL, formerly Finnish Police Federation) is a trade union representing police and associated workers in Finland.

The union was founded in 1923. In 1945, it affiliated to the Finnish Federation of Trade Unions (SAK), but it left in 1956. In 1969, it joined the SAK's successor, the Central Organisation of Finnish Trade Unions. By 1984, it was unhappy with the federation's links to the Social Democratic Party, so it transferred to the Confederation of Salaried Employees (TVK). By 1992, it had grown to 12,940 members. However, that year the TVK went bankrupt, and the union transferred to the Finnish Confederation of Professionals (STTK).

In 1995, the Finnish Criminal Police Union, and the Finnish Police Confederation merged into the union, while in 2002, the Finnish Emergency Response Officers' Union was established as a section of the SPJL. In 2016, the union moved federation again, leaving the STTK, and joining the Confederation of Unions for Professional and Managerial Staff in Finland.

As of 2020, the union has about 11,000 members, including 90% of serving police officers in Finland.
