= Media Auxiliary Memory =

Media Auxiliary Memory or Medium Auxiliary Memory (MAM) refers to a chip embedded into a digital media device (usually a tape cartridge) that stores a small amount of data or metadata that a computer can read without having to read the actual tape.

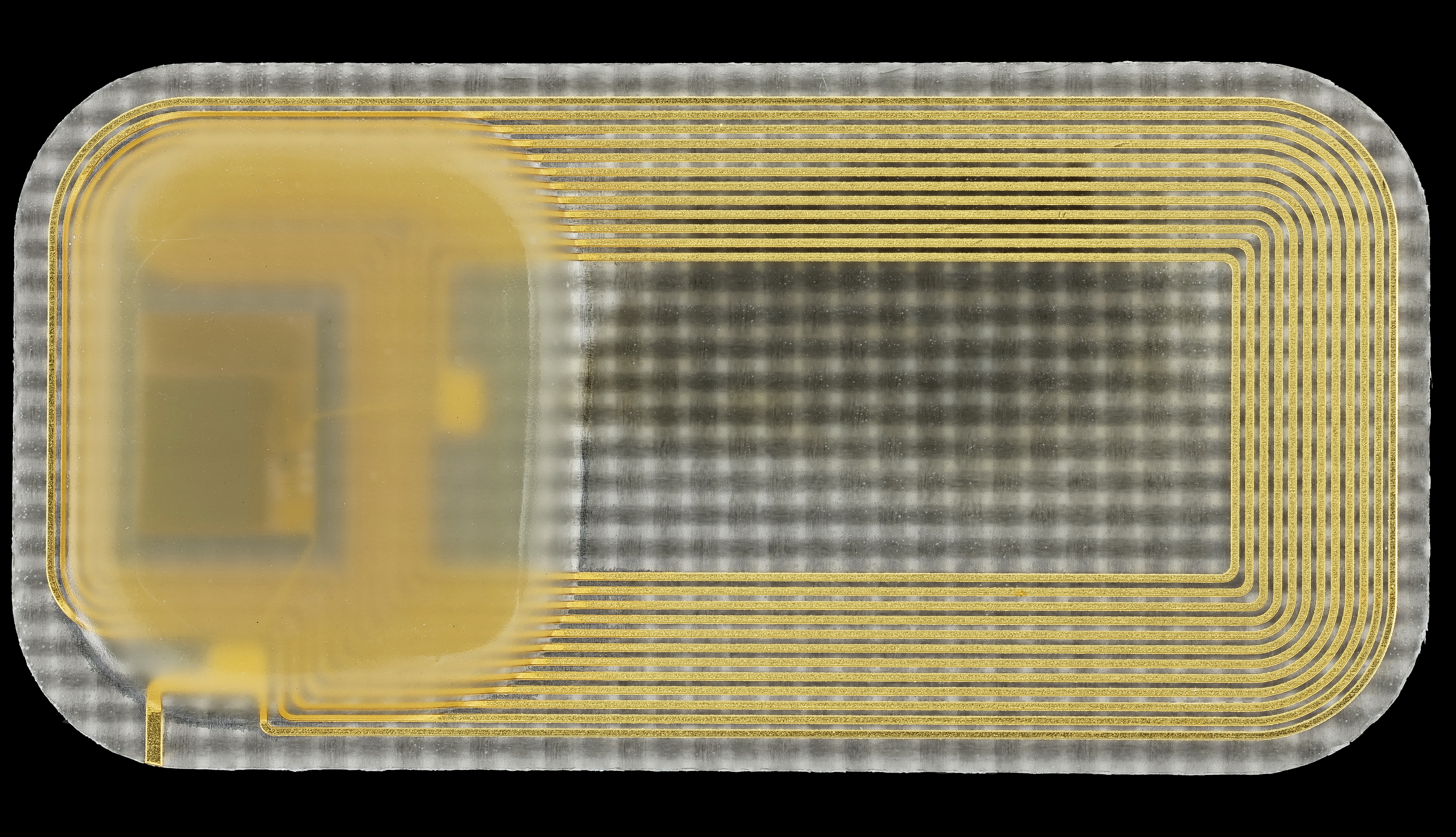
Cartridge Memory module from an LTO-3 cartridge. Approximate dimensions: 0.5 x 1.0 inches

MAMs can be used by the tape driver to increase efficiency, or by custom software to store & retrieve custom data.

Some examples of MAM's are Cartridge Memory (HP/Seagate/IBM LTO) and MIC (Sony AIT).
