= Finnish Union of Practical Nurses =

Trade union in Finland

SuPer
- Finnish Union of Practical Nurses
- Suomen lähi- ja perushoitajaliitto Finlands närvårdar- och primärskötarförbund
- Founded: 1948
- Headquarters: Helsinki, Finland
- Location: Finland
- Members: 75,000
- Affiliations: STTK
- Website: www.superliitto.fi

The Finnish Union of Practical Nurses (SuPer, Finnish: Suomen lähi- ja perushoitajaliitto SuPer, Swedish: Finlands närvårdar- och primärskötarförbund SuPer) is a trade union in Finland.

SuPer is the largest trade union in Finland for professionals with vocational upper-secondary qualifications in social and health care or education and guidance, and those studying in these fields.

The union was founded in 1948, and soon affiliated to the Confederation of Salaried Employees (TVK). In 1992, the TVK went bankrupt, and the union transferred to the Finnish Confederation of Professionals (STTK). By 2005, the union had more than 63,000 members.
