= Business Administration Union =

Trade union of Finland

The Business Administration Union (Finnish: Liiketalouden liitto, LTA) is a trade union representing business administrators in Finland.

The union was founded in 1949. For many years, it only accepted members who held degrees in relevant fields, and it was known as the Business Graduates' Union, but it changed its name in 1996, when it broadened its entrance requirements. It affiliated to the Finnish Confederation of Professionals in 1994, and by 1998, it had about 15,000 members.
