= Jean Odon Debeaux =

French botanist

Jean Odon Debeaux (4 August 1826, Agen – 20 February 1910, Toulouse) was a French military pharmacist, botanist and malacologist.

In 1854 he qualified as a pharmacist in Paris, then joined the French Army, and from 1854 to 1859 was stationed in Algeria (Algiers, Boghar and in the region of Kabylie). Later on, he participated in a military expedition to China (1860–62), on which he collected botanical and malacological specimens on stops in the Canary Islands and South Africa. Afterwards, he was stationed in Corsica (1870) and Perpignan (1872), later returning to Algeria, where he worked as chief pharmacist at the hospital in Oran (1880–86). In 1898 he retired and settled in Toulouse.

Most plant taxa with specific epithet of debeauxii commemorate his name, an example being Gymnocarpos debeauxii. As a taxonomist, he circumscribed the grass genus Reimbolea.

== Selected works ==
- Catalogue des plantes observées dans le territoire de Boghar, (1861).
- Essai sur la pharmacie et la matière médicale des Chinois, (1865).
- Algues marines récoltées en Chine pendant l'expédition francaise de 1860-1862, (1875).
- Florule du Tché-foû (province de Chan-tong) (1877).
- Recherches sur la flore des Pyrénées-Orientales, (1878–80).
- Contributions à la flore de la Chine, (1879).
- Révision de la Flore agenaise; suivie de la flore du Lot-et-Garonne, (1889).
- Synopsis de la flore de Gibraltar, (1889), with Gustave Dautez.

He issued the exsiccatae Algues de la Corse (1864-1870) and Plantes de l'Algérie (1880-1883) and contributed with plant material to other exsiccatae and exsiccata-like specimen series.
