= Mesaconitine =

Names
- IUPAC name [(1S,2R,3R,4R,5R,6S,7S,8R,9R,10R,13R,14R,16S,17S,18R)-8-acetyloxy-5,7,14-trihydroxy-6,16,18-trimethoxy-13-(methoxymethyl)-11-methyl-11-azahexacyclo[7.7.2.12,5.01,10.03,8.013,17]nonadecan-4-yl] benzoate

Identifiers
CAS Number	2752-64-9
3D model (JSmol)	Interactive image; Interactive image
ChEBI	CHEBI:6773
ChEMBL	ChEMBL4524871
ChemSpider	390349
EC Number	220-397-6
KEGG	C08698
PubChem CID	16401314
UNII	621OT356HL
- InChI: InChI=1S/C33H45NO11/c1-16(35)45-33-21-18(13-31(39,28(43-6)26(33)37)27(21)44-29(38)17-10-8-7-9-11-17)32-20(41-4)12-19(36)30(15-40-3)14-34(2)25(32)22(33)23(42-5)24(30)32/h7-11,18-28,36-37,39H,12-15H2,1-6H3/t18-,19-,20+,21-,22+,23+,24-,25-,26+,27-,28+,30+,31-,32+,33-/m1/s1 Key: XUHJBXVYNBQQBD-GQPWXMLZSA-N
- SMILES: CC(O[C@@]12[C@@]3([H])[C@H](OC)[C@]4([H])[C@](COC)(CN(C)[C@H]35)[C@H](O)C[C@H](OC)[C@@]45[C@]([H])(C[C@@H](OC)[C@@H]2O)[C@]1([H])C(OC(C6=CC=CC=C6)=O)O)=O; CC(=O)O[C@@]12[C@@H]3[C@@H](C[C@@]([C@@H]3OC(=O)C4=CC=CC=C4)([C@H]([C@@H]1O)OC)O)[C@]56[C@H](C[C@H]([C@@]7([C@H]5[C@H]([C@H]2[C@H]6N(C7)C)OC)COC)O)OC

Properties
Chemical formula	C_{33}H_{45}NO_{11}
Molar mass	631.719 g·mol^{−1}
Appearance	white solid
Density	1.39
Melting point	208 to 209 °C (406 to 408 °F; 481 to 482 K)
Solubility in water	insoluble
Solubility	Chloroform, ethanol, acetone, and methanol

Hazards
- GHS labelling
Pictograms	(GHS06: Toxic)
Signal word	Danger
Hazard statements	H300, H330
Precautionary statements	P260, P264, P270, P271, P284, P301+P316, P304+P340, P316, P320, P321, P330, P403+P233, P405, P501
- Except where otherwise noted, data are given for materials in their standard state (at 25 °C [77 °F], 100 kPa). Infobox references

Mesaconitine (MA) is a highly toxic diterpene, or diester-diterpene alkaloid from plants of the genus Aconitum. It stimulates β-adrenergic receptors, and the consequent activation of intracellular processes can lead to the long-lasting changes in excitability, which in turn leads to disruption of the heart, nerves, and muscles. Hyperexcitability is primarily due to the direct and powerful effect of mesaconitine on voltage-dependent sodium channels in the membranes of excitable cells (neurons, cardiomyocytes, and skeletal muscles).

Mesaconitine is one of several alkaloids in Aconitum. The toxic effects of these alkaloids primarily affect the heart and central nervous system. They can cause cardiac flutter or fibrillation, ventricular arrhythmias, as well as repetitive afterpotentials and oscillations following nerve stimulation.

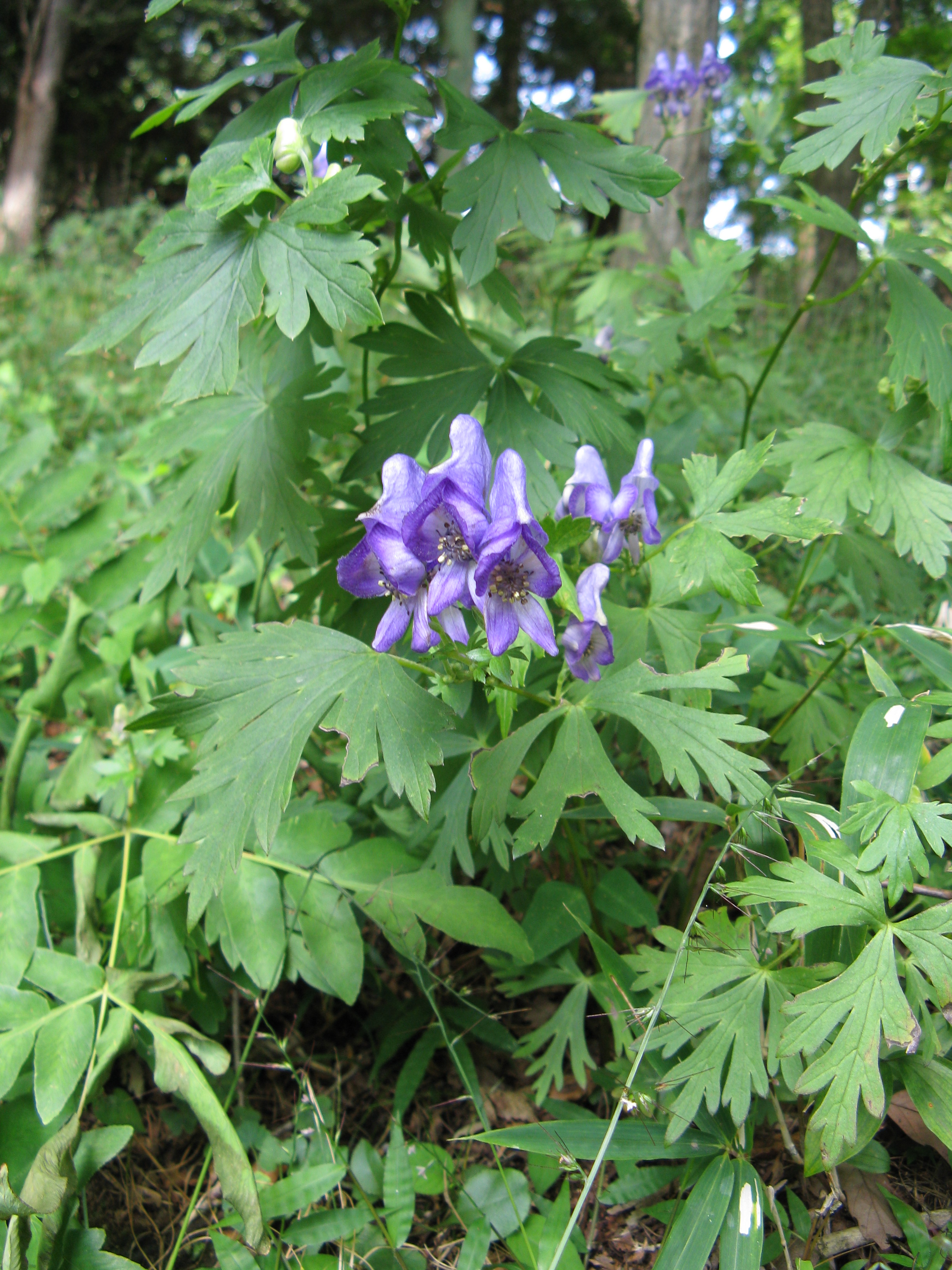
Aconitum carmichaelii, the most common plant containing mesaconitine

This is due to the elimination of the inactivation of voltage-gated Na+ channels. Because of the massive influx of Na^{+}, excitation is replaced by complete inexcitability of nerve cells. Alkaloids of Aconitum sp. cause the release of dopamine from dopaminergic neurons; then an excessive amount of extracellular dopamine creates a load on the antioxidant systems of cells and induces apoptosis of neurons. They are known cardiotoxins and neurotoxins, and also have embryotoxicity and cytotoxicity. They have a large number of defects, such as known cardiotoxins and neurotoxins, and also exhibit embryotoxicity and cytotoxicity.

Mesaconitine activates inhibitory noradrenergic neurones of descending inhibitory pathways. Mesaconitine is capable of evoking a long-lasting excitatory action at a low concentration, a depressant action at high concentrations and biphasic effects in an intermediate concentration range, probably via the involvement of the noradrenergic system. The biphasic effect observed during application of 30 and 100 nM mesaconitine is similar to the action of noradrenaline in the rat hippocampal CA1 region (Hippocampal subfields).

Mesaconitine has been found in Aconitum jaluense, Aconitum japonicum, and other organisms.

== Mesaconitine poisoning ==
Mesaconitine is characterized by extremely high toxicity, manifested in extremely low values of the median lethal dose (LD_{50}) for rodents in the range of 0.068–1.90 mg/kg, with the greatest biological activity observed with intravenous and intraperitoneal routes of administration.

Mesaconitine poisoning affects multiple organ systems, with symptoms typically appearing within minutes to a few hours of exposure. The clinical picture includes a combination of severe neurological, gastrointestinal, and cardiovascular effects. The poisoning can occur from ingesting aconite plants mistakenly or from the improper use of herbal medicines containing the toxin.

As a rule, the toxic effects of mesaconitine are similar to those of aconitine; studies on guinea pigs have shown that mesaconitine has a more enhanced arrhythmogenic effect including ventricular extrasystoles, atrioventricular block, ventricular tachycardia , and ventricular fibrillation how classic aconitine.

Most deaths from mesaconitine occur from cardiovascular complications, particularly ventricular arrhythmia, which is closely associated with the use of Aconitum roots for herbal purposes.

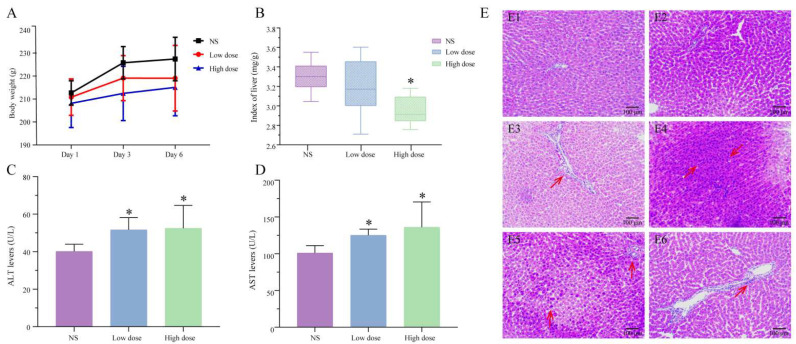
(A) The body weight of rats in the NS group and the MA group increased within 6 days. (B) Index of liver in NS group and MA group (compared with NS group: * p < 0.05). Results were analyzed by one-way ANOVA followed by a LSD (Least Significant Difference) test for multiple comparisons. (C) Serum ALT levels. The data were analyzed using a Kruskal–Wallis non-parametric test. (D) Serum AST levels. The data were analyzed using a Kruskal–Wallis non-parametric test. (E) Effects of MA on the morphology of liver in rats. NS group (E1,E2), low-dose group (E3,E4), high-dose group (E5,E6), red arrow points to hepatocyte necrosis or inflammatory cell infiltration.

SD rats were randomly divided into a normal saline (NS) group, a low-dose mesaconitine group (0.8 mg/kg/day), and a high-dose Mesaconitine group (1.2 mg/kg/day). After 6 days of administration, Mesaconitine-induced liver toxicity was observed. In the course of the metabolonomic study, differential metabolites of Mesaconitine were obtained, such as phenylalanine, retinyl ester, L-proline, and 5-hydroxyindoleacetaldehyde, which are involved in the metabolism of amino acids, vitamins, glucose, and lipids.

The results of the western blot analysis showed that the expression of HMOX1, IL2, and caspase-3 proteins in the liver increased significantly following Mesaconitine administration (p < 0.05). Integrated with the metabolomics and network toxicology findings, it is suggested that mesaconitine may induce hepatotoxicity by activating oxidative stress, initiating an inflammatory response, and inducing apoptosis.

== Signs and symptoms ==
Neurological disorders, Uncontrolled excitation of sensory nerve fibers and symptoms of tetraparesis: sensory lesions (paresthesia and numbness of the face, perioral area and four limbs), motor (muscle lesions weakness in four limbs)

The cardiovascular features include hypotension, chest pain, palpitations, bradycardia, sinus tachycardia, ventricular ectopics, ventricular tachycardia, and ventricular fibrillation.

the gastrointestinal features include nausea, vomiting, abdominal pain, and diarrhea.

Atypical symptoms may include tingling in the mouth, photophobia, and visual impairment, which is similar in symptoms to aconitine poisoning

The causes of death are reported to be refractory ventricular arrhythmias and asystole (Cardiovascular complications primarily in cases of poisoning), with an overall hospital mortality rate of 5.5%.

treatment is symptomatic

== Treatment ==
Treatment is symptomatic, aimed at preserving the patient's vital functions.

Vital signs and functions should be maintained, and blood pressure and heart rate should be closely monitored. If hypotension persists, inotropic therapy is required, and atropine should be used to treat bradycardia. Ventricular arrhythmias caused by mesaconitine and other aconitum alkaloids are often refractory to electrical cardioversion and antiarrhythmic drugs.

The use of drugs such as amiodarone and flecainide are justified first-line drugs. In refractory cases of ventricular arrhythmias and complications of cardiogenic shock, it is necessary to maintain systemic blood flow and arterial pressure.

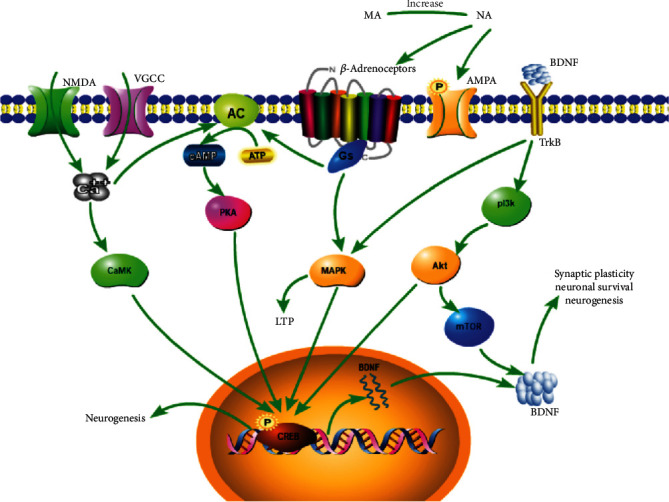
Role of β-adrenoceptors on antidepressant effect. All arrows indicate activation arrows. Gs: stimulating adenylate cyclase g protein; ATP: adenosine triphosphate; AC: adenylate cyclase; cAMP: cyclic adenosine monophosphate; PKA: protein kinase A; CREB: cAMP-response element-binding protein; BDNF: brain-derived neurotrophic factor; LTP: long-term potentiation; AMPA: α-amino-3-hydroxy-5-methyl-4-isoxazole propionate receptor.

== Neuropharmacological effects of mesaconitine ==
Despite its extreme toxicity, mesaconitine may act on the central noradrenergic and serotonin systems, acting similarly to norepinephrine reuptake inhibitors and tricyclic antidepressants, which increase norepinephrine levels in stress-induced depression.

The image on the right shows a detailed plan of the effect of mesaconitine on β-adrenergic receptors and its role. (The role of β-adrenergic receptors in the action of antidepressants. All directions indicate a targeted effect.)

== Chemical-target interactions ==
Mesaconitine inhibits the reaction protein ABCB11 leads to an increase in the transport of taurodeoxycholic acid and ABCB1A protein affects the susceptibility to mesaconitine which affects the expression of S100B protein ABCB1A protein affects the susceptibility to mesaconitine.
