= Union of Insurance Employees =

Trade union of Finland

- Formation: 1945
- Dissolved: 2021
- Website: www.vvl.fi

The Union of Insurance Employees (Finnish: Vakuutusväen Liitto, VvL) was a trade union representing workers in the insurance industry in Finland.

The union was founded in 1945, and affiliated to the Confederation of Salaried Employees (TVK). The TVK went bankrupt in 1992, and the union transferred to the Finnish Confederation of Professionals. By 1998, it had 11,800 members.

On 1 January 2021, the union merged into Trade Union Pro.
