= Maa =

Maa or MAA may refer to:

== Arts and entertainment ==
=== Music ===
- Maa (1998 album), by Sagarika
- Maa (2007 album), by Rajaton
- Maa, 1991 ballet music by Kaija Saariaho
- Maa (2019 album), by Zubeen Garg

=== Film and television ===
- Maa (1952 film), Indian Hindi-language film directed by Bimal Roy
- Maa (1959 film), Indian Odia-language film directed by Nitai Palit
- Maa (1976 film), Indian Hindi-language film directed by M. A. Thirumugham
- Maa (1991 film), Indian Hindi-language film starring Jeetendra and Jaya Pradha
- Maa, a 1992 Indian Bengali-language film directed by Prashanta Nanda
- Maa (2022 film), Indian Punjabi-language film by Baljit Singh Deo
- Maa, a 2023 film starring Pori Moni
- Maa (2025 film), Indian Hindi-language film directed by Vishal Furia
- Dhoop Mein Thandi Chaav...Maa or Maa, Indian Hindi-language TV series
- Maa....Tomay Chara Ghum Ashena or Maa, an Indian Bengali-language TV serial
- Star Maa, a Telugu-language television channel based in Hyderabad, India

== Printed media ==
- Maa (newspaper), Estonian newspaper
- Maa (novel), a novel by Anisul Hoque

== Transportation ==
- Chennai International Airport (IATA airport code MAA), Meenambakkam, India
- Maastricht Aachen Airport (IATA airport code MST), Netherlands
- Magma Arizona Railroad, the reporting mark of Magma Arizona Railroad, US

== Organizations ==
- Manufacturer's Aircraft Association, a 1917 US aerospace committee
- Maryland Aviation Administration, an aviation agency under the state of Maryland Department of Transportation
- Mathematical Association of America, a professional society that focuses on mathematics
- Medieval Academy of America, a US organization in the field of medieval studies
- Microcomputer Applications Associates, a predecessor to Gary Kildall's Digital Research
- Military Aviation Authority, part of the UK Ministry of Defence responsible for regulating air safety across Defence
- Montreal AAA, a Canadian athletic association
- Moot Alumni Association, the alumni association of the Willem C. Vis International Commercial Arbitration Moot
- Museum of Archaeology and Anthropology, University of Cambridge

== People ==
- MAA (singer), Japanese pop singer, previously known as Mar from the band Marbell
- Maa Afia Konadu (1950–2019), Ghanaian media personality

== Other ==
- Moliets-et-Maa, a commune in France
- Maa Palaeokastro, an archaeological site in Cyprus
- Metres above the Adriatic (m.a.A.), used in some european countries as common reference
- Maa languages, a group of closely related languages (or dialects) spoken in Tanzania and Kenya
  - Maa language, or Maasai
- Mano language, a Mande language of Liberia and Guinea
- Master-at-arms, a type of security or training personnel
- Marketing authorisation application, an application to market a new drug
- Message Authenticator Algorithm, an early cryptographic function
- Methacrylic acid, a low-molecular-weight carboxylic acid
- Multi-area agreement, a grouping of local-body areas in the United Kingdom
- Measurement assisted assembly, any method of assembly in which measurements are used to guide assembly processes
- Technetium (99mTc) albumin aggregated (^{99m}Tc-MAA), a radiopharmaceutical used for nuclear medicine lung imaging
- Mid-America Apartment Communities, a US real estate investment trust
