= Measurement-assisted assembly =

Method of assembly in production

Measurement-assisted assembly (MAA) is any method of assembly in which measurements are used to guide assembly processes. Such processes include:

- Predictive fettling/shimming in which component measurements are used to predict gaps and interferences prior to assembly, and these predictions are used to enable a right-first-time assembly
- Assemble-Measure-Move (AMM) processes where a component is positioned approximately in an assembly, the position of the component is measured and then it is moved towards its specified position. This process may be iterated a number of times before the component is within its specified position, alternatively 'real time' measurements may be used to 'track' the component into location.
- Active tooling is a form of assembly fixture which does not rely on inherent dimensional stability to provide an accurate location for components but rather uses frequent measurements to facilitate in active compensation.
- Closed loop control of assembly automation in order to improve the accuracy of flexible automation systems such as industrial robots.

Measurement-assisted assembly is typically used for large structures such as aircraft and steel fabrications. It can be used to improve production rates, reduce reworking and increase flexibility for processes where manual reworking during assembly is required to maintain assembly form and component interface conditions. This type of approach generally offers no advantages where part-to-part interchangeability can already be achieved.
