= Ma (Javanese) =

Syllable in the Javanese script

ma
- ꦩ
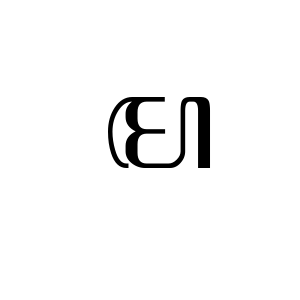
- Aksara nglegena

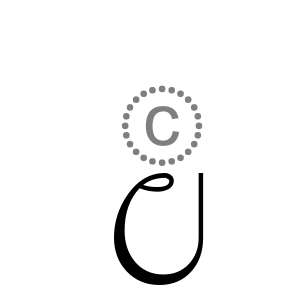
- Aksara pasangan

Usage
- Writing system: Javanese script
- Latin orthography: ma
- Sound values: [m]
- In Unicode: A9A9

ꦩ is one of the syllables in the Javanese script that represents the sounds /mɔ/, /ma/. It is transliterated to Latin as "ma", and sometimes in Indonesian orthography as "mo". It has another form (pasangan), which is ◌꧀ꦩ, but represented by a single Unicode code point, U+A9A9.

== Pasangan ==
Its pasangan form ◌꧀ꦩ, is located on the bottom side of the previous syllable. For example, ꦲꦤꦏ꧀ꦩꦕꦤ꧀ - anak macan (little tiger).

== Murda ==
The letter ꦩ doesn't have a murda form.

== Glyphs ==
Nglegena forms				Pasangan forms			
ꦩ ma	ꦩꦃ mah	ꦩꦁ mang	ꦩꦂ mar	◌꧀ꦩ -ma	◌꧀ꦩꦃ -mah	◌꧀ꦩꦁ -mang	◌꧀ꦩꦂ -mar
ꦩꦺ me	ꦩꦺꦃ meh	ꦩꦺꦁ meng	ꦩꦺꦂ mer	◌꧀ꦩꦺ -me	◌꧀ꦩꦺꦃ -meh	◌꧀ꦩꦺꦁ -meng	◌꧀ꦩꦺꦂ -mer
ꦩꦼ mê	ꦩꦼꦃ mêh	ꦩꦼꦁ mêng	ꦩꦼꦂ mêr	◌꧀ꦩꦼ -mê	◌꧀ꦩꦼꦃ -mêh	◌꧀ꦩꦼꦁ -mêng	◌꧀ꦩꦼꦂ -mêr
ꦩꦶ mi	ꦩꦶꦃ mih	ꦩꦶꦁ ming	ꦩꦶꦂ mir	◌꧀ꦩꦶ -mi	◌꧀ꦩꦶꦃ -mih	◌꧀ꦩꦶꦁ -ming	◌꧀ꦩꦶꦂ -mir
ꦩꦺꦴ mo	ꦩꦺꦴꦃ moh	ꦩꦺꦴꦁ mong	ꦩꦺꦴꦂ mor	◌꧀ꦩꦺꦴ -mo	◌꧀ꦩꦺꦴꦃ -moh	◌꧀ꦩꦺꦴꦁ -mong	◌꧀ꦩꦺꦴꦂ -mor
ꦩꦸ mu	ꦩꦸꦃ muh	ꦩꦸꦁ mung	ꦩꦸꦂ mur	◌꧀ꦩꦸ -mu	◌꧀ꦩꦸꦃ -muh	◌꧀ꦩꦸꦁ -mung	◌꧀ꦩꦸꦂ -mur
ꦩꦿ mra	ꦩꦿꦃ mrah	ꦩꦿꦁ mrang	ꦩꦿꦂ mrar	◌꧀ꦩꦿ -mra	◌꧀ꦩꦿꦃ -mrah	◌꧀ꦩꦿꦁ -mrang	◌꧀ꦩꦿꦂ -mrar
ꦩꦿꦺ mre	ꦩꦿꦺꦃ mreh	ꦩꦿꦺꦁ mreng	ꦩꦿꦺꦂ mrer	◌꧀ꦩꦿꦺ -mre	◌꧀ꦩꦿꦺꦃ -mreh	◌꧀ꦩꦿꦺꦁ -mreng	◌꧀ꦩꦿꦺꦂ -mrer
ꦩꦽ mrê	ꦩꦽꦃ mrêh	ꦩꦽꦁ mrêng	ꦩꦽꦂ mrêr	◌꧀ꦩꦽ -mrê	◌꧀ꦩꦽꦃ -mrêh	◌꧀ꦩꦽꦁ -mrêng	◌꧀ꦩꦽꦂ -mrêr
ꦩꦿꦶ mri	ꦩꦿꦶꦃ mrih	ꦩꦿꦶꦁ mring	ꦩꦿꦶꦂ mrir	◌꧀ꦩꦿꦶ -mri	◌꧀ꦩꦿꦶꦃ -mrih	◌꧀ꦩꦿꦶꦁ -mring	◌꧀ꦩꦿꦶꦂ -mrir
ꦩꦿꦺꦴ mro	ꦩꦿꦺꦴꦃ mroh	ꦩꦿꦺꦴꦁ mrong	ꦩꦿꦺꦴꦂ mror	◌꧀ꦩꦿꦺꦴ -mro	◌꧀ꦩꦿꦺꦴꦃ -mroh	◌꧀ꦩꦿꦺꦴꦁ -mrong	◌꧀ꦩꦿꦺꦴꦂ -mror
ꦩꦿꦸ mru	ꦩꦿꦸꦃ mruh	ꦩꦿꦸꦁ mrung	ꦩꦿꦸꦂ mrur	◌꧀ꦩꦿꦸ -mru	◌꧀ꦩꦿꦸꦃ -mruh	◌꧀ꦩꦿꦸꦁ -mrung	◌꧀ꦩꦿꦸꦂ -mrur
ꦩꦾ mya	ꦩꦾꦃ myah	ꦩꦾꦁ myang	ꦩꦾꦂ myar	◌꧀ꦩꦾ -mya	◌꧀ꦩꦾꦃ -myah	◌꧀ꦩꦾꦁ -myang	◌꧀ꦩꦾꦂ -myar
ꦩꦾꦺ mye	ꦩꦾꦺꦃ myeh	ꦩꦾꦺꦁ myeng	ꦩꦾꦺꦂ myer	◌꧀ꦩꦾꦺ -mye	◌꧀ꦩꦾꦺꦃ -myeh	◌꧀ꦩꦾꦺꦁ -myeng	◌꧀ꦩꦾꦺꦂ -myer
ꦩꦾꦼ myê	ꦩꦾꦼꦃ myêh	ꦩꦾꦼꦁ myêng	ꦩꦾꦼꦂ myêr	◌꧀ꦩꦾꦼ -myê	◌꧀ꦩꦾꦼꦃ -myêh	◌꧀ꦩꦾꦼꦁ -myêng	◌꧀ꦩꦾꦼꦂ -myêr
ꦩꦾꦶ myi	ꦩꦾꦶꦃ myih	ꦩꦾꦶꦁ mying	ꦩꦾꦶꦂ myir	◌꧀ꦩꦾꦶ -myi	◌꧀ꦩꦾꦶꦃ -myih	◌꧀ꦩꦾꦶꦁ -mying	◌꧀ꦩꦾꦶꦂ -myir
ꦩꦾꦺꦴ myo	ꦩꦾꦺꦴꦃ myoh	ꦩꦾꦺꦴꦁ myong	ꦩꦾꦺꦴꦂ myor	◌꧀ꦩꦾꦺꦴ -myo	◌꧀ꦩꦾꦺꦴꦃ -myoh	◌꧀ꦩꦾꦺꦴꦁ -myong	◌꧀ꦩꦾꦺꦴꦂ -myor
ꦩꦾꦸ myu	ꦩꦾꦸꦃ myuh	ꦩꦾꦸꦁ myung	ꦩꦾꦸꦂ myur	◌꧀ꦩꦾꦸ -myu	◌꧀ꦩꦾꦸꦃ -myuh	◌꧀ꦩꦾꦸꦁ -myung	◌꧀ꦩꦾꦸꦂ -myur

== Unicode block ==
Javanese script was added to the Unicode Standard in October, 2009 with the release of version 5.2.

Javanese^{[1]}^{[2]} Official Unicode Consortium code chart (PDF)
	0	1	2	3	4	5	6	7	8	9	A	B	C	D	E	F
U+A98x	ꦀ	ꦁ	ꦂ	ꦃ	ꦄ	ꦅ	ꦆ	ꦇ	ꦈ	ꦉ	ꦊ	ꦋ	ꦌ	ꦍ	ꦎ	ꦏ
U+A99x	ꦐ	ꦑ	ꦒ	ꦓ	ꦔ	ꦕ	ꦖ	ꦗ	ꦘ	ꦙ	ꦚ	ꦛ	ꦜ	ꦝ	ꦞ	ꦟ
U+A9Ax	ꦠ	ꦡ	ꦢ	ꦣ	ꦤ	ꦥ	ꦦ	ꦧ	ꦨ	ꦩ	ꦪ	ꦫ	ꦬ	ꦭ	ꦮ	ꦯ
U+A9Bx	ꦰ	ꦱ	ꦲ	꦳	ꦴ	ꦵ	ꦶ	ꦷ	ꦸ	ꦹ	ꦺ	ꦻ	ꦼ	ꦽ	ꦾ	ꦿ
U+A9Cx	꧀	꧁	꧂	꧃	꧄	꧅	꧆	꧇	꧈	꧉	꧊	꧋	꧌	꧍		ꧏ
U+A9Dx	꧐	꧑	꧒	꧓	꧔	꧕	꧖	꧗	꧘	꧙					꧞	꧟
Notes 1.As of Unicode version 17.0 2.Grey areas indicate non-assigned code points
