= International Federation for the Promotion of Mechanism and Machine Science =

- English language logo of the IFToMM

- List of members
- Abbreviation: IFToMM
- Formation: September 29, 1969
- Founders: I. Artobolevski, E. Crossley, and others.
- Founded at: Zakopane
- Type: NGO
- Legal status: International Federation
- Purpose: Professional Cooperation
- Region served: World
- Members: 44 member organizations
- Secretary General: Erwin Christian Lovasz
- President: Andrés Kecskeméthy
- Vice-President: Fernando Viadero
- Website: iftomm-world.org

International Federation for the Promotion of Mechanism and Machine Science (IFToMM) is an organization that supports international exchange of researchers and engineers from the wide range of discipline related to Mechanical Engineering.

== Mission ==
To promote research and development in the field of Machines and Mechanisms by theoretical and experimental methods, along with their practical application.

== History ==
It was on September 29, 1969 at the Second World Congress on Theory of Mechanisms and Machines which took place in Zakopane (Poland), that two scientists, Ivan Artobolevski (USSR) and Erskine Crossley (USA), proposed to establish an International Federation of scientists and engineers to facilitate worldwide collaboration. Representatives of 13 countries signed the foundation act and the International Federation for the Theory of Machines (IFToMM) came into existence. The initial Member Organizations were represented by:

- Academician Ivan I. Artobolevski (USSR),
- Prof. Erskine F.R. Crossley (USA),
- Prof. Michael S. Konstantinov (Bulgaria),
- Dr. Werner Thomas (GFR),
- Prof. B.M. Belgaumkar (India),
- Prof. Kenneth H. Hunt (Australia),
- Prof. J. Oderfeld (Poland),
- Prof. Jack Phillips (Australia),
- Prof. George Rusanov (Bulgaria),
- Prof. Wolfgang Rössner (GDR),
- Prof. Zènò Terplàn (Hungary),
- Prof. Jammi S. Rao (India),
- Prof. Giovanni Bianchi (Italy),
- Prof. Adam Morecki (Poland),
- Nicolae I. Manolescu (Romania),
- Leonard Maunder (UK),
- Douglas Muster (USA),
- Ilic Branisky (Yugoslavia).

Given the expansion of the topics within the IFToMM umbrella, in 1999, the Executive Council decided to recognize the changing role of the organization in international collaboration and approved a new name: "The International Federation for the Promotion of Mechanism and Machine Science". However, the Executive Council considered that the abbreviation IFToMM was already widely used, and therefore suggested to keep it (along with the logo) as a short version of the organization's name.

=== Officers, Presidents, and General Secretaries ===
IFToMM officers are the Chairs of IFToMM Member Organizations, the Chairs of Permanent Commissions and Technical Committees, as well as the members of the Executive Council. A complete historical list of IFToMM officers was published in the Proceedings of the Second International Symposium on History of Machines and Mechanisms HMM2004.

The Presidents were:

- Ivan I. Artobolevskii (USSR),
- Leonard Maunder (United Kingdom),
- Bernard Roth (USA),
- Giovanni Bianchi (Italy),
- Adam Morecki (Poland),
- Jorge Angeles (Canada),
- Kenneth J. Waldron (USA),
- Marco Ceccarelli (Italy),
- Yoshihiko Nakamura (Japan),
- Marco Ceccarelli (Italy) (repeated), and
- Andrés Kecskeméthy (Germany).

The Secretaries General were:

- M.S. Konstantinov (Bulgaria),
- Emil Stanchev (Bulgaria),
- Adam Morecki (Poland),
- Elizabeth Filemon (Hungary),
- Ladislav Půst (Czechoslovakia),
- Tatu Leinonen (Finland),
- Marco Ceccarelli (Italy),
- Teresa Zielinska (Poland) (two terms), and
- Erwin Christian Lovasz (Romania).

== Meetings ==
- IFToMM General Assembly: every 4 years
- Executive Council Meeting: an annual meeting of the members of Executive Council
- IFToMM World Congress: every four years

List of all IFToMM World congresses:

World Congress	Host Institution(s)	Host country (City)	Dates	No. of papers	No. of countries represented
1st IFToMM World Congress		Bulgaria (Varna)	September 27–30, 1965	64 (4 volumes)	14
2nd IFToMM World Congress		Poland (Zakopane)	September 23–27, 1969	66 (3 volumes)	12
3rd IFToMM World Congress		Yugoslavia (Kupari)	September 1971	198 (8 volumes)	22
4th IFToMM World Congress		United Kingdom (Newcastle upon Tyne)	September 8–12, 1975	230 (5 volumes)	28
5th IFToMM World Congress		Canada (Montreal)	July 8–13, 1979	350 (2 volumes)	34
6th IFToMM World Congress		India (New Delhi)	December 15–20, 1983	338 (2 volumes)	35
7th IFToMM World Congress		Spain (Seville)	September 17–22, 1987	417 (3 volumes)	38
8th IFToMM World Congress		Czechoslovakia (Prague)	August 26–31, 1991	359 (6 volumes)	40
9th IFToMM World Congress		Italy (Milan)	August 29 – September 5, 1995	665 (3 volumes)	51
10th IFToMM World Congress		Finland (Oulu)	June 20–24, 1999	628 (7 volumes)	50
11th IFToMM World Congress		China (Tianjin)	April 1–4, 2004 ^{[a]}	491 (5 volumes)	43
12th IFToMM World Congress		France (Besançon)	June 17–20, 2007	535 (digital proceedings)	52
13th IFToMM World Congress	Universidad de Guanajuato	Mexico (Guanajuato)	June 19–25, 2011	309 (digital proceedings)	43
14th IFToMM World Congress	National Taiwan University	Taiwan (Taipei)	October 25–30, 2015	559 (digital proceedings)	47
15th IFToMM World Congress	AGH University of Science and Technology	Poland (Kraków)	June 30–July 4, 2019	457 (digital proceedings)	66
16th IFToMM World Congress	Japanese council of IFToMM	Tokyo (Japan)	November 5–10, 2023 ^{[b]}		

== Notes ==
^{a} Postponed from August 18–21, 2003, due to SARS.
^{b} Decided at the IFToMM General Assembly on July 3, 2019 (Krakow, Poland).

== Members ==
Membership in IFToMM is not individual. Instead, it is by Member Organization (MO) which are akin to national or territorial organizations. A full list of Member Organizations available on the IFToMM web site. Each MO has its own individual or group membership rules.

As of the 2015 General Assembly held in Taipei (Taiwan), IFToMM had 47 MOs. In 2018, the membership went down to 45 MOs.

Current MOs in IFToMM
Armenia
Australia
Austria
Azerbaijan
Belarus
Brazil (ABCM)
Bulgaria
Canada (CCToMM)
China [China-Beijing]
Taiwan [China-Taipei]
Croatia
Czech Republic
Denmark
Finland
France (CFToMM)
Georgia
Germany
Greece
Hungary
India (AMM India)
Israel
Italy (ItaMMMS)
Japan (Jc-IFToMM)
Kazakhstan
Korea
Lithuania
Mexico
Netherlands
Peru
Poland (PK TMM)
Portugal
Romania
Russia
Serbia
Singapore
Slovakia
Slovenia
Spain
Switzerland
Tunisia (ATM)
Turkey
United States of America
Vietnam

Former MOs in IFToMM
Belgium
Ghana
Egypt
Latvia
Moldova
Mongolia
New Zealand
North Macedonia
Norway
Pakistan
Sweden
United Kingdom
Ukraine
Venezuela

== Organizational structure ==
The organizational structure of IFToMM includes following bodies

=== General Assembly ===
The General Assembly is the supreme body of the Federation that determines policy. It is composed of the Chief Delegates of IFToMM Members and members of the Executive Council.

=== Executive Council ===
The Executive Council is responsible for managing the affairs of the Federation between the sessions of the General Assembly. The Executive Council includes the President, Vice-President, Secretary-General, Treasurer, and six ordinary members.

=== Commissions and Committees ===
There are four Permanent Commissions (PCs) and 14 Technical Committees (TCs) established under IFToMM supervision. Each Permanent Commission and Technical Committee is composed of a Chairperson, appointed by the Executive Council, and a Secretary and members, nominated by the Chairperson and appointed by the Executive Council. The general goals for the work of the Commissions and Committees are aimed at promoting their fields of interest by attracting researchers and practitioners, including young individuals. The four PCs are:

- Permanent Commission for Communications, Publications and Archiving
- Permanent Commission for Education
- Permanent Commission for the History of Mechanism and Machine Science
- Permanent Commission for the Standardization of Terminology

While the 14 TCs are:

- Technical Committee for Biomechanical Engineering
- Technical Committee for Computational Kinematics
- Technical Committee for Engines and Powertrains
- Technical Committee for Gearing and Transmissions
- Technical Committee for Linkages and Mechanical Controls
- Technical Committee for Micromachines
- Technical Committee for Multi-body Dynamics
- Technical Committee for Reliability
- Technical Committee for Robotics and Mechatronics
- Technical Committee for Rotordynamics
- Technical Committee for Sustainable Energy Systems
- Technical Committee for Transportation Machinery
- Technical Committee for Tribology
- Technical Committee for Vibrations

== See also ==
- Theory of Mechanisms and Machines
- Canadian Committee for the Theory of Machines and Mechanisms
