= Union of Sales and Marketing Professionals =

Trade union of Finland

- Union of Sales and Marketing Professionals
- Myynnin ja markkinoinnin ammattilaiset MMA
- Founded: 1895
- Headquarters: Helsinki, Finland
- Location: Finland
- Members: 20,000 (2020)
- Key people: Marko Hovinmäki, president
- Affiliations: Akava
- Website: www.mma.fi

The Union of Sales and Marketing Professionals (Finnish: Myynnin ja markkinoinnin ammattilaiset MMA) is a trade union in Finland. It represents professionals working in sales, marketing, and purchasing. With its 20,000 members, MMA is one of the biggest affiliates of Akava, the Confederation of Unions for Professional and Managerial Staff in Finland. MMA is a former member of STTK.

== Regional Associations ==
MMA is divided into 23 regional membership associations. MMA's members are automatically members of the regional membership associations. Entrepreneurs and members working in the medical field have their own associations.

== Administration ==
The council and the board are the key decision-makers in the union. Members and chairmen for these two bodies are elected every four years. The council convenes twice a year, and its most important tasks are decisions concerning the union's finances, plan of action, and membership fees.

The board runs the union according to the rules and decisions made by the council. The board convenes several times per year together with representatives from the union's office.

== Membership ==
To its members, MMA provides several services and benefits such as free legal services, counseling in work-related problems, consulting, negotiating and reconciling, advocating, research-based information about the industry, variety of training courses, and various discounts and recreational activities.

In April 2020 MMA launched an unconventional partnership with a large volunteer marketing initiative and network to help those whose work has been radically affected by the COVID-19 situation.

MMA publishes a print magazine called Myynti & Markkinointi (Engl. Sales & Marketing). The magazine is published four times a year and is free of charge to all the union's members.
