= Myanmar Music Association =

Myanmar's music industry association

- မြန်မာနိုင်ငံဂီတအစည်းအရုံး
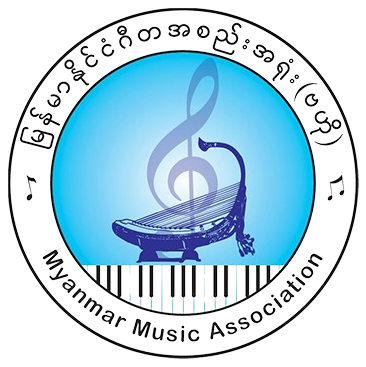
- Logo of the Myanmar Music Association
- Formation: 1952; 74 years ago
- Headquarters: Yangon, Myanmar
- Location: No. 2, Dhammadana Street, Natchaung Ward, Tamwe Township
- Official language: Burmese; English
- Chairman: Tin U Lay
- Website: www.myanmarmusicassociation.org
- Formerly called: Burma Music Association (BMA)

The Myanmar Music Association (MMA; Burmese: မြန်မာနိုင်ငံဂီတအစည်းအရုံး) is a Myanmar's music industry association. The organisation was established in 1952 and consists of 5 divisions: historical traditional music, modern traditional music, contemporary music, production and technical work.

MMA established a Burmese pop library in 2010, to create a standardised list of songs published in the country, and of help musicians and songwriters obtain their proper share of royalty payments from the use of their songs. In 2013, it reopened a traditional Burmese music school, which had been closed since 2007.

In July 2015, MMA announced that it would launch the Myanmar Music Academy Awards in 2016 to recognise outstanding Burmese musicians.

== Censorship ==
All pieces of media in Myanmar are subject to strict review by the Burmese government's censor board. Producers are required to submit their records to the Myanmar Music Association, and if the record is approved it will be allowed a limited test run. As a result of this, most songwriters are forced to avoid writing about controversial topics that can be banned by the Music Association, Jennifer Leehey commented that that many writers have taken to "writing in a crazy way" that allows them to express themselves in a way which is bereft of any direct political meaning is the only way that allows their work to get approval and be published.
