= Union of Health and Social Care Professionals – Tehy =

Tehy
- Union of Health and Social Care Professionals - Tehy
- Founded: 1982
- Headquarters: Helsinki, Finland
- Location: Finland
- Affiliations: STTK, PSI
- Website: www.tehy.fi/en

The Union of Health and Social Care Services - Tehy is a trade union in Finland. Tehy is the major trade union for health care professionals, social workers and students of these professions in Finland.

It is affiliated with the Finnish Confederation of Salaried Employees, and Public Services International.

The union was founded in 1982 with the merger of several smaller healthcare unions, the largest of which was the Finnish Union of Nurses.

It affiliated to Confederation of Salaried Employees (TVK), but TVK went bankrupt in 1992, and the union transferred to the Finnish Confederation of Professionals. By 1998, it had 117,200 members.

In the autumn of 2007, Tehy organised a mass resignation in which 12,800 nurses and other members gave their notice, ending their employment on 19 November 2007. The resignations are in advocacy of higher salaries for Tehy members. The Finnish parliament promptly passed a law that now allows the authorities to force nurses back to work.
