= Confederation of Salaried Employees =

The Confederation of Salaried Employees (Finnish: Toimihenkilö- ja virkamiesjärjestöjen Keskusliitto, TVK) was a national trade union centre in Finland.

The federation was established in 1917, as the Henkisen Työn Keskusliitto. It was refounded in 1922 and 1944, then again in 1956, as TVK. Several of its largest affiliates left during the 1980s. By 1991, it had 15 remaining unions affiliated, with a total membership of 405,494. The following year, it declared bankruptcy and was dissolved, with most of its remaining affiliates transferred to the Finnish Confederation of Professionals, greatly increasing its size.

The most important affiliates of the federation included the Federation of Service and Clerical Employees, Bank Employees' Union, Union of Salaried Employees in Industry, Finnish Union of Practical Nurses, Union of Health and Social Care Professionals, Federation of Municipal Officers, Federation of Employees in State-owned Corporations, Union of Insurance Employees, Public Services Union, Finnish Police Union, Finnish Business People's Union, Finnish Union of Nurses, and Civil Servants' Union.
