= Confederation of Unions for Professional and Managerial Staff in Finland =

Trade union confederation in Finland

Akava
- Confederation of Unions for Professional and Managerial Staff in Finland
- Finnish: Korkeakoulutettujen työmarkkinakeskusjärjestö Swedish: Centralorganisationen för högutbildade i Finland

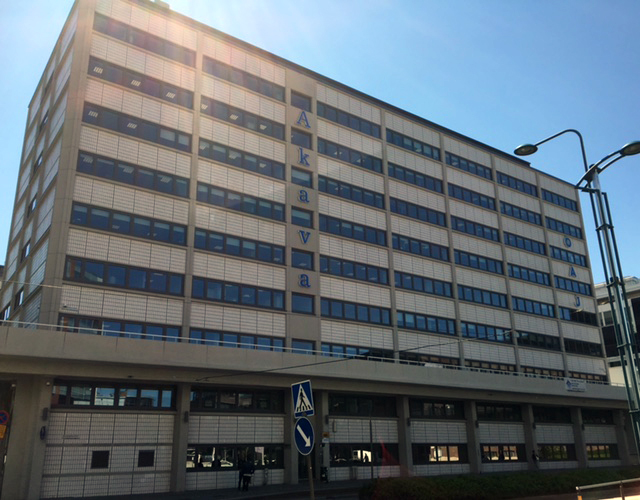
- Akava's office building in Itä-Pasila, Helsinki
- Founded: 1950
- Headquarters: Helsinki, Finland
- Location: Finland
- Members: 611,000 (2021)
- Key people: Maria Löfgren, president
- Affiliations: ITUC, NFS, ETUC, TUAC
- Website: akava.fi

The Confederation of Unions for Professional and Managerial Staff in Finland (Akava) is a trade union confederation in Finland representings employees with university-level, professional or other high-level training. It has 36 affiliated unions with a combined membership of 611,000.

Akava is a central organization i.e. the individual members are not personally members of Akava but of a trade union which is a member of Akava. Akava has 36 member unions, the largest of which are the Trade Union of Education in Finland (OAJ), the Finnish Association of Graduate Engineers (TEK), the Union of Professional Engineers in Finland (UIL), the Finnish Association of Business School Graduates, Union of Sales and Marketing Professionals and Tradenomiliitto. The Finnish Police Union (SJPL) is also affiliated.

On November 14, 2022, Maria Löfgren was elected as President of Akava. Akava is affiliated with the European Trade Union Confederation and Eurocadres .

Akava is one of the three central organizations representing Finnish employees, the other two being the Finnish Confederation of Salaried Employees (STTK) and the Central Organisation of Finnish Trade Unions (SAK).
