= Minister without portfolio =

Government minister with no specific responsibilities or who does not head a ministry

A minister without portfolio is a government minister without specific responsibility as head of a government department. The sinecure is particularly common in countries ruled by coalition governments and a cabinet with decision-making authority wherein ministers without portfolio, while they may not head any particular offices or ministries, may still receive a ministerial salary and have the right to cast a vote in cabinet decisions. The office may also exist to be given to party leaders whose offices (such as a parliamentary leader) would not otherwise enable them to sit in Cabinet.

== Albania ==
In Albania, a "Minister without portfolio" is considered a member of the government who is generally not in charge of a special department, does not have headquarters or offices, and usually does not have administration or staff. This post was first introduced in 1918 during the Përmeti II government, otherwise known as the Government of Durrës. The members of this cabinet were referred to as Delegatë pa portofol (delegate without portfolio). The name "minister" was used two years later, during the government of Sulejman Delvina. In the 1990s, the usage of the name Sekretar Shteti (Secretary of State) was common to refer to such a position. Mostly these roles were given to smaller allies by the leading parties. Nowadays the name Ministër i Shtetit (State Minister or Minister of State) is used.

== Australia ==
James Hutchison was given the title in the First Fisher ministry, and Willie Kelly was given the title in the Cook Ministry from June 1913 to September 1914.

Stanley Bruce was given the title of minister without portfolio, when he took up his position in 1932 as the Commonwealth Minister in London. He was given the title by Lyons' Cabinet so that he could better represent the PM and his colleagues free from the limitations of a portfolio. In this case the title was a promotion and carried considerable responsibilities.

== Bangladesh ==
Bangladesh appoints ministers without portfolio during cabinet reshuffles or fresh appointments Ministers are not usually appointed without portfolio as a coalition negotiation – all long run ministers end up with a portfolio. Suranjit Sengupta was a minister without portfolio in Sheikh Hasina's second government. The most recent minister without portfolio was from the Interim government of Bangladesh, Mahfuz Alam, who also served as an adviser to the chief adviser.

== Bulgaria ==
- Bozhidar Dimitrov (2009–2011)

== Brazil ==
The Constitution determines that the Ministries (and also other bodies headed by a Minister of State) are provided for by law, so the Federal Government has less freedom to create and reformulate portfolios as it happens in other cabinets.

=== Extraordinary minister ===
During the brief parliamentary experience, the position of "Extraordinary Minister" was instituted to provide for political and administrative affairs within the Presidency of the Council of Ministers, it was equivalent in prerogatives, advantages, and salaries to a Minister of State. There were no nominations after the return to presidentialism, but a 1964 law created an "Extraordinary Ministry" to coordinate some related bodies that would be equivalent to a ministry of the interior. The reorganization of federal public administration in 1967, provided for the appointment of up to four Extraordinary Ministers to perform temporary duties of a relevant nature.

Currently, the legislation requires that the Coordinator of the Government Transition Cabinet (the team of the candidate elected to the office of President of the Republic) be appointed as an Extraordinary Minister if the nominee is a Senator or a Federal Deputy. In 2018, then President Michel Temer issued a provisional measure creating an "Extraordinary Ministry of Public Security", it became a common ministry after National Congress converted the provisional measure into law.

== Canada ==
While the minister without portfolio is seen by some as a mere sinecure appointment, it has been a role that numerous political notables have played over time, including future Prime Minister Jean Chrétien, who filled the role in a Pearson cabinet in the 1960s; John Turner also "kept a seat warm" in a Pearson cabinet. Notable Conservatives who filled the role include R. B. Bennett, and Arthur Meighen; however, Meighen served this role after he had been prime minister.

The title of minister without portfolio has been used off and on; in recent times, though, the title has fallen out of favour, and the penultimate minister without portfolio, Gilles Lamontagne, was promoted to postmaster general in 1978. The practice has continued primarily under the guise of ministers of state without responsibilities in the ministers' titles.

The position has also been filled on the federal or provincial level by experienced politicians near the end of their careers as a way of allowing them to counsel the government and take on projects without the burdens associated with administering a government department.

In January 2021, Prime Minister Justin Trudeau appointed Jim Carr as a minister without portfolio, in addition to his role as special representative to the Prairies. Carr had previously served as a cabinet minister until November 2019, leaving as a consequence of his diagnosis with multiple myeloma.

== China ==
A state councillor (Chinese: 国务委员) is similar to ministers without portfolio. The 14th state councillors from 2023 are:

- Li Shangfu (former)
- Wang Xiaohong
- Wu Zhenglong
- Shen Yiqin
- Qin Gang (former)

== Croatia ==
- Dragutin Kalogjera (1990)
- Zvonimir Medvedović (1990)
- Gojko Šušak (1990–1991)
- Zdravko Mršić (1990–1991)
- Dražen Budiša (1991–1992)
- Ivan Cesar (1991–1992)
- Ivica Crnić (1992)
- Darko Čargonja (1992)
- Živko Juzbašić (1991–1992)
- Mladen Vedriš (1992)
- Vladimir Veselica (1991)
- Muhamed Zulić (1991–1992)
- Zvonimir Baletić (1991–1992)
- Slavko Degoricija (1991)
- Stjepan Zdunić (1991)
- Čedomir Pavlović (1992–1993)
- Smiljko Sokol (1992–1993)
- Zlatko Mateša (1993–1995) – Prime Minister (1995–2000)
- Juraj Njavro (1993–1997)
- Ivan Majdak (1993–1995)
- Marijan Petrović (1995)
- Adalbert Rebić (1995)
- Davor Štern (1995)
- Branko Močibob (1995–1997)
- Gordana Sobol (2002–2003)
- Bianca Matković (2009–2011)
- Goran Marić (2016)

=== Deputy Prime Ministers without portfolio ===
- Bernardo Jurlina (1990–1991)
- Mate Babić (1990)
- Milan Ramljak (1990–1992)
- Franjo Gregurić (1990–1991) – Prime Minister (1991–1992)
- Mate Granić (1991–1993) – Minister of Foreign Affairs (1993–2000)
- Jurica Pavelić (1991–1992)
- Zdravko Tomac (1991–1992)
- Ivan Milas (1992–1993)
- Vladimir Šeks (1992–1994)
- Mladen Vedriš (1992–1993)
- Ivica Kostović (1993–1995)
- Bosiljko Mišetić (1995)
- Borislav Škegro (1993–1997)
- Ljerka Mintas-Hodak (1995–1998)
- Željka Antunović (2000–2002)
- Slavko Linić (2000–2003)
- Goran Granić (2000–2002)
- Ante Simonić (2002–2003)
- Damir Polančec (2005–2008)
- Đurđa Adlešić (2008–2010)
- Slobodan Uzelac (2008–2011)
- Domagoj Ivan Milošević (2010–2011)
- Tomislav Karamarko (2016)
- Božo Petrov (2016) – Speaker of Parliament (2016–2017)
- Boris Milošević (2020–2022)
- Anja Šimpraga (2022–2024)

== Denmark ==
Three "control ministers" served as ministers without portfolio during World War I.

After the Liberation of Denmark in May 1945, the first Danish cabinet included four ministers without portfolio. Among these were Danish ambassador to the U.S. Henrik Kauffmann, who had conducted his own foreign policy throughout the war, and refused to follow orders from Copenhagen as long as Denmark remained occupied by a foreign power. Kauffmann served in this capacity from 12 May to 7 November 1945. The three other holders of this title had joined the cabinet a few days before – Aksel Larsen (Communist Party of Denmark), Kr. Juul Christensen (Danish Unity), and Frode Jakobsen (Social Democrats).

Lise Østergaard held a position as minister without portfolio with special attention to foreign policy issues in Anker Jørgensen's cabinet from 26 February 1977 to 28 February 1980.

Anders Fogh Rasmussen appointed Bertel Haarder as minister without portfolio, but effectively Minister for European Affairs. Haarder served in this capacity from 27 November 2001 to 18 February 2005. The reason for appointing a minister without a ministry was the Danish European Union Presidency of 2002. Haarder was considered the most experienced Danish politician on European affairs.

== Estonia ==
- Jaan Tõnisson (1918) (provisional government)
- Karl Ast (1924–1925)
- Ants Oidermaa (1939–1940)
- Juhan Kaarlimäe (1944)
- Johannes Sikkar (1952–1953) (in exile)
- Artur Terras (1952–1953) (in exile)
- Aksel Mark (1956–1962) (in exile)
- Arvo Horm (1956–1964) (in exile)
- Peeter Panksep (1956–1964) (in exile)
- Eduard Leetmaa (1959–1962) (in exile; appointed, but did not enter office)
- Ivar Grünthal (1962–1964) (in exile)
- Renate Kaasik (1971–1990) (in exile)
- Verner Hans Puurand (1973–1977) (in exile)
- Jaan Timusk (1973–1990) (in exile)
- Ants Pallop (1973–1992) (in exile)
- Arvo Horm (1977–1992) (in exile)
- Ivar Paljak (1985–1990) (in exile)
- Olev Olesk (1986–1990) (in exile)
- Endel Lippmaa (1990–1991) (interim government)
- Artur Kuznetsov (1990–1991) (interim government)
- Klara Hallik (1992) (interim government)
- Arvo Niitenberg (1992) (interim government)
- Jüri Luik (1992–1993)
- Peeter Olesk (1993–1994)
- Eiki Nestor (1994–1995)
- Arvo Niitenberg (1994–1995)
- Ants Leemets (1995)
- Jaak Allik (1995–1996)
- Endel Lippmaa (1995–1996)
- Tiit Kubri (1995–1997)
- Riivo Sinijärv (1996)
- Andra Veidemann (1996–1999)
- Peep Aru (1997–1999)
- Katrin Saks (1999–2003)
- Toivo Asmer (1999–2003)
- Eldar Efendijev (2002–2003)
- Paul-Eerik Rummo (2003–2007)
- Jaan Õunapuu (2003–2007)
- Urve Palo (2007–2009)
- Urmas Kruuse (2014)
- Anne Sulling (2014)

== Finland ==
Minister without portfolio is not a common type of cabinet position, and the last minister without portfolio served in 1949. The most famous one was Juho Kusti Paasikivi, who was a part of the "Triumvirate" of Prime Minister Risto Ryti, Minister of Foreign Affairs Väinö Tanner and Paasikivi during the Winter War and the year 1940.

- Mikko Luopajärvi (Agrarian Union) 17.4.1919 – 15.8.1919 (Kaarlo Castren Cabinet), 15.8.1919 – 5.1.1920 (Vennola I Cabinet)
- Kalle Aukusti Lohi (Agrarian Union) 31.3.1925 – 31.12.1925 (Tulenheimo Cabinet)
- Matti Paasivuori (Social Democratic Party) 13.12.1926 – 15.11.1927 (Tanner Cabinet)
- Kalle Jutila (Agrarian Union) 17.12.1927 – 16.10.1928 (Sunila I Cabinet)
- Juhani Leppälä (Agrarian Union) 16.8.1929 – 27.8.1929 (Kallio III Cabinet)
- Eljas Erkko (Progressive Party) 20.10.1932 – 25.11.1932 (Sunila II Cabinet)
- Ernst von Born (Swedish People's Party) 13.10.1939 – 1.12.1939 (Cajander III Cabinet)
- Juho Kusti Paasikivi (Unaffiliated/No party) 1.12.1939 – 27.3.1940 (Ryti I Cabinet)
- Mauno Pekkala (Social Democratic Party) 17.11.1944 – 24.11.1944 (Paasikivi II Cabinet)
- Hertta Kuusinen (Finnish People's Democratic Party) 26.5.1948 – 4.6.1948 (Pekkala Cabinet)
- Aleksi Aaltonen (Social Democratic Party) 29.7.1948 – 30.7.1948 (Fagerholm I Cabinet)
- Unto Varjonen (Social Democratic Party) 29.7.1949 – 19.8.1949 (Fagerholm I Cabinet)

== Germany ==
- Hermann Göring (1933)
- Ernst Röhm (1933-1934)
- Rudolf Hess (1933–1941)
- Arthur Seyss-Inquart (1939–1945)
- Hjalmar Schacht (1939–1943)
- Martin Bormann (1941–1945)

Since 1949, a Federal Minister for Special Affairs (Bundesminister für besondere Aufgaben) is a member of the Federal Government that does not have charge of a Federal Ministry, although the ministry is now commonly assigned to the Heads of the German Chancellery to give this important government functionary cabinet-rank. The ministry was first created in October 1953, to give a ministry level position to Franz Josef Strauss, but has been used almost exclusively for the Head of the Federal Chancellery since the 1960s. A notable exception occurred in the course of German reunification when four members of East Germany's last government were made "Minister for Special Affairs" from October 3, 1990, to January 1991.

== Greece ==
The position of a Minister without portfolio was first created in 1918, with Emmanouil Repoulis being the first Minister without portfolio. Previously, the term had been used to describe Prime Ministers who had not undertaken any secondary Ministerial position (e.g. Ministry of Foreign Affairs). Prominent politicians like Georgios Papandreou, Panagiotis Kanellopoulos, Napoleon Zervas, and Spyros Markezinis served as Ministers without portfolio during their career, while novelist Nikos Kazantzakis had a brief, 46-day-long tenure as Minister without portfolio in Sofoulis' 1945 cabinet.

In 1991, the position was renamed to Minister of State; the last person to be designated Minister without portfolio and simultaneously the first Minister of State, is Mikis Theodorakis.

== Hungary ==
- Zsolt Semjén (2010–2026)
- Tamás Fellegi (2011–2012)

== India ==
- N. Gopalaswami Ayyangar (1947–48), Mohanlal Saksena (1948–50), and C. Rajagopalachari (1950) – 1st Nehru government
- V. K. Krishna Menon (1956) – 2nd Nehru government
- T. T. Krishnamachari (1962) and Lal Bahadur Shastri (1964) – 3rd Nehru government
- Murasoli Maran (2002–03) and Mamata Banerjee (2003–04) – 3rd Vajpayee government
- K. Chandrasekhar Rao (2004) and Natwar Singh (2005) – 1st Manmohan Singh government
- Vilasrao Deshmukh (2012) – 2nd Manmohan Singh government
- Arun Jaitley (2018) – 1st Modi government

== Indonesia ==
Since the inception of the state, Indonesia had ministers without portfolio, usually given the title Menteri Negara ('State Minister'). The number was not fixed, entirely depended on the behest of the President. Although not explicitly forbidden, Law No. 39/2008 on State Ministries mandated that a ministry must have specific function and responsibilities, and also must have minimum number of directorates and other ministerial apparatuses, thus formation of minister without portfolio is currently unlikely in post-Reformation Indonesia.

Below is the list of ministers without portfolio that ever existed in Indonesian history.

=== Presidential Cabinet (19 August – 14 November 1945) ===
- Mohammad Amir
- Sartono
- Alexander Andries Maramis
- Oto Iskandar di Nata

=== First Sjahrir Cabinet (11 November 1945 – 28 February 1946) ===
- Rasjidi (on religious affairs)

=== Third Sjahrir Cabinet (5 October 1946 – 27 July 1947) ===
- Hamengkubuwono IX
- Wahid Hasyim
- Wikana (on youth affairs)
- Sudarsono Mangunadikusumo
- Tan Po Goan (on Chinese affairs)
- Danoedirdja Setiaboedi

=== Sixth Development Cabinet (6 June – 1 October 1997) ===
The cabinet was unique, with President Suharto moved the Minister of Information Harmoko to the office of State Minister of Special Affairs (Indonesian: Menteri Negara Urusan Khusus) on 6 June 1997. The Ministry of Special Affairs was dissolved on 1 October 1997, following the inauguration of next-term's parliament and the appointment of Harmoko as its speaker.

== Ireland ==
The Ministers and Secretaries (Amendment) Act 1939 allows a Minister to be a member of the Government of Ireland who does not have charge of a Department of state, such a person to be known as a "Minister without portfolio". Such a minister may be given a specific style or title. The only substantive minister without portfolio has been Frank Aiken, the Minister for the Co-ordination of Defensive Measures during World War II. By the Emergency Powers Act 1939 then in force, the Minister for Defence was able to delegate some competences to him.

On a number of occasions a minister has been appointed to an incoming government with the title of a new Department of state. Between the date of appointment and the date of creation of the department, such a minister is formally a minister without portfolio.

| Title | Govt | Minister | Appt to govt | Dept created | Dept |
|---|---|---|---|---|---|
| Minister for Economic Planning and Development | 15th | Martin O'Donoghue | 8 July 1977 | 13 December 1977 | Department of Economic Planning and Development |
| Minister for Public Expenditure and Reform | 29th | Brendan Howlin | 9 March 2011 | 6 July 2011 | Department of Public Expenditure and Reform |
| Minister for Rural and Community Development | 31st | Michael Ring | 14 June 2017 | 19 July 2017 | Department of Rural and Community Development |
| Minister for Further and Higher Education, Research, Innovation and Science | 32nd | Simon Harris | 27 June 2020 | 2 August 2020 | Department of Further and Higher Education, Research, Innovation and Science |

When Helen McEntee took six months' maternity leave on 28 April 2021, her portfolio as Minister for Justice was reassigned to Heather Humphreys, in addition to Humphreys's existing portfolio as Minister for Social Protection and Minister for Rural and Community Development. McEntee remained a member of the coalition government as minister without portfolio, and was reassigned to the Department of Justice on 1 November 2021. On 25 November 2022, Heather Humphreys was again appointed as Minister for Justice to facilitate a second period of six months' maternity leave from December.

== Israel ==
It is common practice in Israel to appoint ministers without portfolio as part of the coalition negotiations, as it allows small coalition partners a seat at the cabinet table. All cabinets in recent years have had at least some such appointment. The Governance Law passed in 2013 forbade ministers without portfolio effectively ending the practice, however in spite of some objections, after the 2015 elections this issue was revisited in the Knesset, and it was allowed for the practice to resume. The full alphabetical list of ministers without portfolio since 1949 is:

- Mansour Abbas (2021–2022)
- Ofir Akunis (2015)
- Yosef Almogi (1961–62)
- Shulamit Aloni (1974, 1993)
- Yehuda Amital (1995–96)
- Shaul Amor (1999)
- Zalman Aran (1954–55)
- Moshe Arens (1984–86, 1987–88)
- Eli Avidar (2021–2022)
- Ruhama Avraham (2007–08)
- Ami Ayalon (2007–08)
- Yisrael Barzilai (1969–70)
- Benny Begin (2009–13, 2015)
- Menachem Begin (1967–70)
- Mordechai Ben-Porat (1982–84)
- Yosef Burg (1984)
- Eitan Cabel (2006–07)
- Ra'anan Cohen (2001–02)
- Yitzhak Cohen (2006–08)
- Aryeh Deri (1993)
- Aryeh Dolchin (1969–70)
- Sarah Doron (1983–84)
- Abba Eban (1959–60)
- Rafael Edri (1988–90)
- Yaakov Edri (2006–07)
- Effi Eitam (2002)
- Gadi Eizenkot (2023–2024)
- Yisrael Galili (1966–67, 1969–77)
- Benny Gantz (2023–2024)
- Akiva Govrin (1963–64)
- Mordechai Gur (1988–90)
- Gideon Hausner (1974–77)
- Tzachi Hanegbi (2016, 2020)
- Yigal Hurvitz (1984–88)
- Haim Landau (1978–79)
- Pinhas Lavon (1952–54)
- David Levy (2002)
- Yitzhak Levy (2002)
- Tzipi Livni (2001–02)
- David Magen (1990)
- Raleb Majadele (2007)
- Dan Meridor (2001–03)
- Yitzhak Moda'i (1981–82, 1986–88)
- Shaul Mofaz (2012)
- Peretz Naftali (1951–52, 1955–59)
- Meshulam Nahari (2006–13)
- Dan Naveh (2001–03)
- Moshe Nissim (1978–80, 1988–90)
- Ehud Olmert (1988–90)
- Yossi Peled (2009)
- Shimon Peres (1969)
- Yitzhak Peretz (1984, 1987–88)
- Haim Ramon (2005)
- Gideon Sa'ar (2023–2024)
- Pinchas Sapir (1968–69)
- Yosef Sapir (1967–69)
- Avner Shaki (1988–90)
- Yosef Shapira (1984–88)
- Ariel Sharon (1983–84)
- Yifat Shasha-Biton (2023–2024)
- Victor Shem-Tov (1969–70)
- Salah Tarif (2001–02)
- Hili Tropper (2023–2024)
- Ezer Weizman (1984–88)
- Dov Yosef (1952–53)
- Rehavam Ze'evi (1991–92)

== Jamaica ==
Current ministers without Portfolio:

- Robert Montague
- Andrew Wheatley
- Audrey Marks
- Matthew Samuda

== Japan ==
In Japan, minister without portfolio (無任所大臣, Muninnsyo-Daijinn) is not defined by law. The Cabinet Act of Japan (内閣法, Naikakuhou) does not forbid ministers who do not serve any ministries, establishing the existence of minister without portfolio.

There are two meanings of minister without portfolio in Japan: The broader sense is a minister who is neither Prime Minister of Japan or ministers of Cabinet of Japan, while the narrower sense is further from the broader sense - which specifically refers to ministers without ministries and certain titles such as Chair of the National Public Safety Commission, Chief Cabinet Secretary, or Minister of State for Special Missions (ja). In Japan, a minister without portfolio usually refers to the narrower sense.

There has not been minister without portfolio since Takashi Sasagawa of the Mori Cabinet in 2001. Most ministers without serving ministries in a cabinet will be Ministers of State for Special Missions in practice.

== Kenya ==
In Kenya, ministers without portfolio are not common. However three individuals have held the position in the country's history. They are:

- Chunilal Madan (1956–1957) He was the first Kenyan minister with Asian descent, and also country's first minister without portfolio. He was appointed to oversee Kenya's Colonial government operations prior to being appointed as a judge in the country's Supreme court in 1957.
- Raphael Tuju (2018–2022). He was appointed by Uhuru Kenyatta to oversee government operations in his second term of presidency.
- Cleophas Wakhungu Malala (2023–2024). He was appointed as the secretary general of the ruling party UDA to oversee the operations of the ruling party and push the hustler agenda for the next five years. Malala was however unceremoniously fired by UDA for sympathizing with former deputy president, Rigathi Gachagua.

== Malta ==
- Carmelo Abela (2020–2022)
- Joe Mizzi (1996–1998)
- Konrad Mizzi (2016–2017) On April 28, 2016, following the appearance of his name in the Panama Papers leaks, Prime Minister Joseph Muscat announced in a press conference at the Auberge de Castille that Konrad Mizzi was to be removed from the position of Health and Energy Minister. Mizzi would however retain the title of minister without portfolio, working within the Office of the Prime Minister.

== Nepal ==
Ram Sharan Mahat.

== Netherlands ==
A minister without portfolio in the Netherlands is a minister that does not head a specific ministry, but assumes the same power and responsibilities as a minister that does. The minister is responsible for a specific part of another minister's policy field. In that sense, a minister without portfolio is comparable to a state secretary (state secretary or junior minister) in Dutch politics, who also falls under another ministry and is responsible for a specific part of that minister's policy field. However, one distinct difference is that a minister without portfolio is a member of the council of ministers and can vote in it, whereas a state secretary is not. The minister for development cooperation has always been a minister without portfolio.

== New Zealand ==
In the First Labour Government from 1935, Mark Fagan, was a "minister without portfolio" from 1935 to 1939, as was David Wilson from 1939 to 1949. They were appointed to the upper house and made a "minister without portfolio" to add them to the cabinet, although neither were elected to a seat in Parliament.

In the Third National Government, Keith Holyoake, was made a Minister of State 1975–77 after he had retired as party leader, and in the Fourth National Government Robin Gray was made a Minister of State 1993–96, after he was replaced as Speaker (though he was also Associate Minister of Foreign Affairs). Both appointments were considered sinecures to avoid their return as 'backbenchers'.

The following were appointed to the Executive Council as ministers without portfolio.

Key

Liberal Reform United Labour National
†: Died in office

| Name | Portrait | Term of office | | Prime Minister |
|---|---|---|---|---|
| James Carroll | | 16 March 1892 | 20 February 1896 | Ballance |
| James Carroll | | 16 March 1892 | 20 February 1896 | Seddon |
| Alfred Cadman | | 21 December 1899 | 9 May 1901 | Seddon |
| William Montgomery | | 19 July 1893 | 7 November 1895 | Seddon |
| Mahuta Tāwhiao | | 22 May 1903 | 6 August 1906 | Seddon |
| Mahuta Tāwhiao | | 22 May 1903 | 6 August 1906 | Hall-Jones |
| Āpirana Ngata | | 7 January 1909 | 28 March 1912 | Ward |
| Peter Buck | | 28 March 1912 | 10 July 1912 | Mackenzie |
| Thomas Buxton | | 28 March 1912 | 10 July 1912 | Mackenzie |
| Māui Pōmare | | 10 July 1912 | 3 May 1916 | Massey |
| William Fraser | | 27 July 1920 | 16 July 1923† | Massey |
| David Guthrie | | 25 June 1924 | 31 March 1927† | Massey |
| David Guthrie | | 25 June 1924 | 31 March 1927† | Bell |
| David Guthrie | | 25 June 1924 | 31 March 1927† | Coates |
| Heaton Rhodes | | 18 January 1926 | 10 December 1928 | Coates |
| Francis Bell | | 24 May 1926 | 25 August 1928 | Coates |
| Sir Joseph Ward | | 28 May 1930 | 8 July 1930† | Forbes |
| Robert Masters | | 20 August 1930 | 22 September 1931 | Forbes |
| Mark Fagan | | 6 December 1935 | 18 July 1939 | Savage |
| David Wilson | | 18 November 1939 | 30 May 1940 | Savage |
| David Wilson | | 18 November 1939 | 30 May 1940 | Fraser |
| Paraire Karaka Paikea | | 21 January 1941 | 6 May 1943† | Fraser |
| Eruera Tirikatene | | 26 May 1943 | 13 December 1949 | Fraser |
| Adam Hamilton | | 16 July 1940 | 5 October 1942 | Fraser |
| Gordon Coates | | 16 July 1940 | 5 October 1942 | Fraser |
| William Polson | | 15 March 1950 | 12 December 1950 | Holland |
| Sidney Holland | | 20 September 1957 | 12 December 1957 | Holyoake |
| David Seath | | 24 January 1962 | 20 December 1963 | Holyoake |
| Hugh Watt | | 13 March 1975 | 12 December 1975 | Rowling |

== North Macedonia ==
As of 2017, ministers without portfolio (министер без ресор) are:

- Ramiz Merko
- Edmond Ademi
- Robert Popovski
- Zoran Sapurik
- Zorica Apostolovska
- Adnan Kahil
- Samka Ibraimovski

== Norway ==
From 2009 to 2013 Karl Eirik Schjøtt-Pedersen (Labour) was a Minister without Portfolio and Chief of Staff in the Prime Ministers Office, where his job was to co-ordinate within government.

== Philippines ==
During the Japanese Occupation of the Philippines, then-Senate President Manuel Roxas was appointed minister without portfolio by the Japanese Government.

== Poland ==
In Poland, the term is used for a minister who is a member of the Council of Ministers but does not head a government department, and is not supported by a ministry. A minister without portfolio performs tasks determined by the prime minister. Since the enactment of the 1997 Constitution, this option has been provided for in Article 149(1).

== Portugal ==
Following the Carnation Revolution, several politicians were made ministers without portfolio:

- Álvaro Cunhal (1st, 2nd, 3rd, 4th provisional government)
- Ernesto Melo Antunes (2nd, 3rd provisional government)
- Francisco Pereira de Moura (1st, 4th provisional government)
- Francisco Sá Carneiro (1st provisional government)
- Joaquim Magalhães Mota (2nd, 3rd, 4th provisional government)
- Jorge Campinos (1st constitutional government)
- Mário Soares (4th provisional government)
- Vítor Alves (2nd, 3rd provisional government)

After the 1st Constitutional Government (1976–1978), there haven't been any appointments of ministers without portfolio.

A similar but not sinecural cabinet position, that of Minister Adjunct (ministro adjunto), who does not head a particular ministry but is instead tasked with the general interministerial measures found in the government programme, has been created in some Portuguese governments.

== Serbia ==
Minister without portfolio is a minister in the Government of Serbia with no particular ministry but who has some specific responsibilities. The office is usually held simultaneously by several people at the same time, usually three to five, depending on the cabinet.

== Singapore ==
In Singapore, the appointment holder is known as the "Minister in the Prime Minister's Office" (PMO).

== Spain ==
In Spain, in addition to the Ministers in charge of a Department, there may be Ministers without a portfolio, who will be responsible for certain government functions. In the event that there are Ministers without a portfolio, the scope of their powers, the administrative structure, as well as the material and personal resources attached to it will be determined by Royal Decree.

== Sweden ==
- Dag Hammarskjöld (1951–1953).
- Olof Palme (1963–1965).

== Taiwan ==
Article 5 of the Organizational Act of the Executive Yuan (Chinese: 行政院組織法) allows the Executive Yuan of the Republic of China to appoint seven to nine Ministers without Portfolio (Chinese: 政務委員). According to the article, they can also serve ministers of councils or commissions in the Executive Yuan. As of 2024, they are:

- Chen Shih-chung
- Liu Chin-ching, also serving as Minister of National Development
- Wu Cheng-wen, also serving as Minister of Science and Technology
- Chen Chin-de, also serving as Minister of Public Construction
- Yang Jen-ni
- Chi Lien-cheng
- Shih Che
- Lin Ming-hsin

== Tanzania ==
President Jakaya Kikwete appointed Professor Mark Mwandosya as a minister without portfolio in 2012.

== Uganda ==
Since 2015, the cabinet list has included a minister without portfolio:

- Abraham Byandala – 2015 until 2016
- Abdul Nadduli – 2016 to 2019
- Kirunda Kivejinja – 2019 to 2021
- Lukia Isanga Nakadama – 2021 to present

== United States ==
The Vice President of the United States is a member of the Cabinet but heads no department. As such, the Vice President may be assigned to policy areas of the President's choosing such as foreign diplomacy (Richard Nixon), space programs (Lyndon B. Johnson), or public health (Mike Pence). Prior to the mid-19th century, the Vice President's position as President of the Senate caused the office to be seen as primarily legislative in nature, and as such they were not assigned to deal with public policy.

Cabinet-level officials are president-designated additional members of the Cabinet, which can vary under each president. Most of them head no department, and some of them are not officers of the United States. For example, the Director of the Office of Management and Budget is the head of the Office of Management and Budget, which is an office within a department, namely the Executive Office of the President of the United States headed by the White House Chief of Staff. Similar situations apply (or applied) for the Chair of the Council of Economic Advisers, the Trade Representative, Director of the Office of Science and Technology Policy, National Security Advisor, Director of the Office of National Drug Control Policy.

An individual who has great influence on government affairs without holding formal office might be described as a "minister without portfolio". Such an appellation is completely unofficial (possibly intended jokingly or disparagingly) and merely serves to underscore the extent of the individual's already-existing influence; it does not grant any new influence or power. Examples include Bernard Baruch, Arthur Burns, and Ivanka Trump.

Herbert Hoover, the Secretary of Commerce under presidents Harding and Coolidge, took the position on the understanding that he would have input on all matters pertaining to the economy. He used this concession so eagerly that Treasury official S. Parker Gilbert dubbed him "Under-Secretary of all other departments."

== Vietnam ==
In the first government of the Democratic Republic of Vietnam founded by Hồ Chí Minh after the August Revolution in September 1945, Cù Huy Cận and Nguyễn Văn Xuân were assigned the "Minister without Portfolio" positions. In January 1946, the "Provisional Coalition Government" was installed, and Nguyen Van Xuan retained the post of Minister without Portfolio while Cu Huy Can was elevated to the Ministry of Agriculture. From November 1946 to early 1955, the Viet Minh (and later the Worker's Party)-led "New Government" fought against the return of France to Indochina and the post Ministers without Portfolio was held by Nguyễn Văn Tố, Đặng Văn Hướng and Bồ Xuân Luật. Since the 1954 Geneva Convention, the position has been vacant, except briefly during the 1960–1964 cabinet elected by the 2nd National Assembly, where Lê Văn Hiến occupied the post "Minister without Portfolio and Deputy Chair of the State Planning Commission."

In 2014, Prime Minister Nguyễn Tấn Dũng tasked the Cabinet Office to examine the possibility of re-introducing the post "Minister without Portfolio." There have been no further developments since.
