= Fagerholm I cabinet =

Fagerholm I Cabinet
- 32nd Cabinet of Finland
- Date formed: 29 July 1948
- Date dissolved: 17 March 1950

People and organisations
- Prime Minister: Karl-August Fagerholm
- Total no. of members: 22
- Member parties: SDP
- Status in legislature: Minority government

History
- Predecessor: Pekkala
- Successor: Kekkonen I

Fagerholm's first cabinet was the 32nd government of Finland, which lasted from 29 July 1948 to 17 March 1950. It was a minority government headed by Social Democratic Prime Minister Karl-August Fagerholm.

Fagerholm’s first cabinet was the first government of which the Finnish People's Democratic League wasn't a part. During the cabinet’s reign, foreign relations to the West, particularly to the United States, improved. During the cabinet’s existence, Finland's State Police was defunct and its successor, the Finnish Security Intelligence Service Supo, was founded.

== Ministers ==
Minister	Period of office	Party
Prime Minister; Karl-August Fagerholm	July 29, 1948 – March 17, 1950	Social Democrat
Minister of Foreign Affairs; Carl Enckell	July 29, 1948 – March 17, 1950	Independent
Deputy Minister of Foreign Affairs; Uuno Takki	July 29, 1948 – March 17, 1950	Social Democrat
Minister of Justice; Tauno Suontausta	July 29, 1948 – March 17, 1950	Social Democrat
Minister of Defence; Emil Skog	July 29, 1948 – March 17, 1950	Social Democrat
Minister of the Interior; Aarre Simonen	July 29, 1948 – March 17, 1950	Social Democrat
Deputy Minister of the Interior; Jussi Raatikainen	July 29, 1948 – March 17, 1950	Social Democrat
Minister of Finance; Onni Hiltunen	July 29, 1948 – March 17, 1950	Social Democrat
Deputy Minister of Finance; Aleksi Aaltonen; Unto Varjonen	July 30, 1948 – March 18, 1949; September 19, 1949 – March 17, 1950	Social Democrat; Social Democrat
Minister of Education; Reino Oittinen	July 29, 1948 – March 17, 1950	Social Democrat
Minister of Agriculture; Matti Lepistö	July 29, 1948 – March 17, 1950	Social Democrat
Deputy Minister of Agriculture; Jussi Raatikainen	July 29, 1948 – March 17, 1950	Social Democrat
Minister of Transport and Public Works; Onni Peltonen	July 29, 1948 – March 17, 1950	Social Democrat
Deputy Minister of Transport and Public Works; Erkki Härmä; Aarre Simonen; Emil Huunonen	July 29, 1948 – June 22, 1949; March 24, 1949 – March 17, 1959; July 29, 1949 – April 17, 1950	Social Democrat; Social Democrat; Social Democrat
Minister of Trade and Industry; Uuno Takki	July 29, 1948 – March 17, 1950	Social Democrat
Deputy Minister of Trade and Industry; Onni Toivonen	July 29, 1948 – March 17, 1950	Social Democrat
Minister of Social Affairs; Valdemar Liljeström; Tyyne Leivo-Larsson; Aleksi Aaltonen	July 29, 1948 – March 4, 1949; March 4, 1949 – March 18, 1949; March 18, 1949 – March 17, 1950	Social Democrat; Social Democrat; Social Democrat
Deputy Minister of Social Affairs; Tyyne Leivo-Larsson; Erkki Härmä; Emil Huunonen	July 29, 1948 – March 17, 1950; July 30, 1948 – June 22, 1949; July 29, 1949 -March 17, 1950	Social Democrat; Social Democrat; Social Democrat
Minister of People's Service; Onni Toivonen	July 29, 1948 – March 17, 1950	Social Democrat
Deputy Minister of People's Service; Erkki Härmä; Emil Huunonen	July 30, 1948 – June 22, 1949; July 29, 1949 – March 17, 1950	Social Democrat; Social Democrat
Minister without Portfolio; Aleksi Aaltonen; Unto Varjonen	July 29, 1948 – July 30, 1948; July 29, 1949 – August 19, 1949	Social Democrat; Social Democrat
Minister at Council of State; Aleksi Aaltonen	July 29, 1948 – March 17, 1950	Social Democrat

Preceded by Pekkala	Cabinet of Finland; July 29, 1948–March 17, 1950	Succeeded by Kekkonen I
