= Tuomas Bryggari =

Finnish politician (1881–1964)

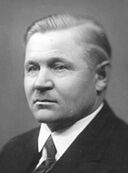

Member of the Parliament of Finland
- In office 5 September 1922 – 21 July 1948
- Constituency: Vaasa Province East

Personal details
- Born: 8 December 1881 Jääski, Russian Empire
- Died: 31 October 1964 (aged 82) Helsinki, Finland
- Party: Social Democratic Party of Finland
- Occupation: Trade unionist

Tuomas Bryggari (8 December 1881 – 31 October 1964) was a Finnish trade unionist, politician and member of the Parliament of Finland, the national legislature of Finland. A member of the Social Democratic Party, he represented Vaasa Province East between September 1922 and July 1948. Prior to being elected, he was imprisoned for political reasons following the Finnish Civil War.

== Early life ==
Bryggari was born on 8 December 1881 in Jääski in the south-east of the Grand Duchy of Finland. He was the son of Paavo Bryggari and Maria Himmanen. He studied at public school for three grades. Bryggari started working as a child and had many jobs during his early life: farm worker/cattle herder, wheelwright, forestry worker, railway construction worker, dockworker and stonemason in Jääske and Helsinki. He was a construction worker on the Jyväskylä–Pieksämäki railway.

== Trade unionism ==
Bryggari became involved in trade unionism in 1905 and was blacklisted by employers. He was a speaker for the Union of Road and Water Construction Workers (Tie- ja vesirakennustyöläisten liitto) in northern Finland. He was on the board of the Helsinki Workers' Association (Helsingin Työväenyhdistys) and Finnish Stone Workers' Union (Suomen kivityöntekijäin liiton). During the August 1917 Helsinki strike Bryggari headed the delegation that met with the Russian Governor-General Mikhail Aleksandrovich Stakhovich and the Senate Vice-president Oskari Tokoi to present the strikers demands.

In December 1917, Bryggari was chosen as one of speakers of the Uusimaa branch of the Social Democratic Party (SDP). Bryggari was amongst tens of thousands of leftists who were imprisoned in concentration camps for political reasons by the Whites following their victory in the Finnish Civil War. After being released, he was secretary of the Finnish Construction Workers' Union (Suomen Rakennustyöväen Liitto) in 1919 but was forced out after communists took over the union. He was an organiser, speaker and lecturer for the Finnish Trade Union Federation (SAJ) from 1920 to 1921.

In 1930 the fascist regime in Finland dissolved the Construction Workers' Union using draconian anti-communist laws. Bryggari was chairman of the union's successor, the SDP led Construction Workers Union, from 1930. This construction union was also taken over by the communists and Bryggari was replaced as chairman by Uno Nurminen in 1939. After the SAJ was also banned in 1930 using anti-communist laws, the SDP established the Finnish Federation of Trade Unions (SAK). Bryggari played a key role in the SAK until 1937.

== Politics ==
Bryggari was the secretary of the Vaasa Province East branch of the SDP from 1921 to 1922. He was elected to the Parliament of Finland at the 1922 parliamentary election. He was re-elected at the 1924, 1927, 1929, 1930, 1933, 1936, 1939 and 1945 parliamentary elections.

Bryggari, who was afflicted with silicosis from his days as a stonemason, fought for a wide interpretation of the Occupational Diseases Act. Officially there were few work-related illnesses but an investigation by a parliamentary committee in 1945-1946 found that the true levels of illnesses had been hidden from the public and that clinics were being overwhelmed by patients with work-related illnesses. Bryggari played a key role in the creation of the Finnish Institute of Occupational Health and the professional health and safety inspection regime.

Bryggari belonged to the peace opposition during the latter stages of the Continuation War and after the war to the Fagerholm opposition which supported closer co-operation with the Finnish People's Democratic League, something the SDP leadership opposed. Bryggari was a presidential elector at the 1925, 1931, 1937, 1940, 1943 and 1950 presidential elections. After retiring form politics Bryggari was worked for the State Electrical Workshop (Valtion Sähköpajan) as an inspector between 1948 and 1951. He was the first chairman of the SDP affiliated National Pensioners' Union (Kansaneläkkeensaajien Keskusliiton).

Bryggari died on 31 October 1964 in Helsinki.

== Personal life ==
Bryggari was married to Lempi Maria Juhontytär (née Bergman) (1887-1926) from 1909 to 1926. They had two daughters, Irja and Aino. He married Ida Wilhelmiina Lumivuokko (née Nieminen) in June 1938.

== See also ==
- List of Finnish MPs imprisoned for political reasons
