= Porkkala (disambiguation) =

Porkkala is a Finnish name, which can mean:

- Porkkalanniemi, a peninsula in Finland, often referred to simply as Porkkala
- Porkkala Naval Base, a temporarily Soviet-held territory in Finland following World War II
- FNS Porkkala, a Pansio-class minelayer
- Veikko Porkkala (1908-2009), Finnish trade union activist

== See also ==
- Porkkalam, a 2010 Indian Tamil-language action film directed by Bandi Saroj Kumar
- Porkkaalam, a 1997 Tamil-language film directed by Cheran
