= Peeter Olesk =

Peeter Olesk may refer to:

- Peeter Olesk (politician) (1953–2021), Estonian literary scholar and politician
- Peeter Olesk (sport shooter) (born 1993), Estonian sport shooter
