= Construction Trade Union =

Trade union of Finland

- Rakennusliitto
- Formation: 1924; 102 years ago
- Merger of: Finnish Painters' Union, Finnish Stonemasons' Union, Finnish Union of Civil and Road Construction Workers, et al
- Type: Trade union
- Headquarters: Helsinki
- Location: Finland
- Field: Construction industry
- Chairperson: Kimmo Palonen
- Publication: Rakentaja
- Website: rakennusliitto.fi
- Formerly called: Rakennustyöläisten Liitto (until 1991)

The Construction Trade Union (Finnish: Rakennusliitto) is a trade union representing workers in the construction industry in Finland.

The union was founded in 1924, when the Finnish Painters' Union merged with the Finnish Stonemasons' Union, the Finnish Union of Civil and Road Construction Workers, and sections of the Finnish Woodworkers' Union and the Finnish Union of Sawmill, Transportation and General Workers. Initially affiliated to the Finnish Trade Union Federation, from 1930, it was affiliated to the Finnish Federation of Trade Unions.

The union gained a reputation for being on the left wing of the labour movement, and after World War II, it affiliated to the Trade Union International of Building, Wood, Building Materials and Allied Industries. For many years, it hosted the international's headquarters, and many of its presidents also served as general secretary of the international.

Since 1969, the union has been affiliated to the Central Organisation of Finnish Trade Unions, with the Finnish Divers' Union and the Finnish Bricklayers' Union soon joining. By 1998, it had 78,746 members, while in 2020, it had 69,060 members.

== Presidents ==
1924: Uno Nurminen
1930: Tuomas Bryggari
1939: Uno Nurminen
1945: Viljo Rautelin
1955: Aarne Saarinen
1967: Erkki Salomaa
1971: Aarno Aitamurto
1987: Pekka Hynönen
2005: Matti Harjuniemi
