= Left Group of Finnish Workers =

Former socialist political party in Finland

Left Group of Finnish Workers (Finnish: Suomen työväen vasemmistoryhmä) was a socialist political party in Finland. The party was active in the late 1920s and early 1930s. The group was founded by activists who had previously cooperated with the Communist Party of Finland (SKP). Niilo Wälläri, Eino Pekkala, Erkki Härmä and Kusti Kulo were some of the well-known leaders of the group. The group had supporters mainly in the southern industrial cities of Finland.

The communists – who followed Comintern's Third Period policy – had a very negative attitude to the Left Group, whose members were branded "vacillators" (Finnish: Hoipertelijat). The group was considered more dangerous than social democrats or the far right. The Left Group called their communist critics fanatical "beaters in the air" (Finnish: Huitojat). The Social Democratic Party of Finland was also critical of the Left Group and they avoided cooperation. It was tactically important for the SDP to maintain an image that considered their left-wing opponents as a single Moscow-led entity.

The Left Group published the paper Suomen Työmies in 1930. In Vaasa, Työn Ääni was also briefly in the hands of the Left Group.

== Schisms of the far left ==
In the 1920s, the underground communist party worked with left socialists in various legal coalitions. Schisms between the partners began to intensify in the mid-1920s. The problematic relations between communists in Finland and those who had emigrated to Soviet Union was the main question. The socialists outside SKP criticized the Soviet-residing leadership and Comintern for excessive intervention in activities inside Finland. A pamphlet called Away with the emigrants (Finnish: Irti emigranteista) was published in April 1925. Conflicts escalated when the SKP adopted the uncompromising third period program of Comintern in 1928. Critical attitude to other leftist parties was now emphasized.

The socialist opposition gained support especially in the trade union movement, in which the social democrats were in minority, and the conflict became pronounced in the 8th congress of Suomen Ammattijärjestö, the Finnish Trade Union centre, in May 1929. The communists tried to gather support for the so-called Copenhagen treaty according to which the cooperation between Finnish, Norwegian and Soviet trade unions was to be increased. In addition, they wanted to end cooperation with the International Labour Organization and to intensify fight against social fascism. The socialist majority of the left-wing majority, however, thought it was not wise to exacerbate the relations with the social democrats further and the initiatives were rejected. Still, the social democrats left the SAJ after the congress as a protest to communists.

The SKP was not happy with the outcome of the SAJ congress and the stance was supported by Comintern. This was made clear in summer 1929 when the communists openly attacked their socialist comrades. Following Comintern orders, the SKP began to oust socialists from leading positions in trade unions. In autumn, the objective was put into practice, and the SKP regained control of the SAJ executive committee. The majority was temporarily lost in 1928 after many leading communists were arrested by the state police. The policy was strongly objected by the socialist trade union leaders including Matti Väisänen and Erkki Härmä. The socialists tried to gain support for an extraordinary SAJ congress but the effort was not successful.

== Left Group gets organized ==
Left Group of Finnish Workers was founded in December 1929. The first central committee consisted of Eino Pekkala (chairman), Uno Nurminen (vice chairman), Hugo M. Ahokanta (secretary), Emil Tuomi, Kusti Kulo and August Raatikainen. Matti Väisänen, Nurminen and Niilo Wälläri formed the important trade union committee. To clarify its policies, the new group released a three-page pamphlet in which the extremist communist line was rejected. In January 1930, the group organ Suomen Työmies hit the newsstands. In its first issue the paper emphasized independence of the Finnish workers' movement and demanded that the union statutes should be respected.

In spring the Left Group acted against SAJ policy of founding new trade unions to sectors controlled by the social democrats who had left the central organization. Meanwhile, the communist strengthened their positions in the SAJ and three prominent socialist leaders, Wälläri (Kuljetustyöläisten liitto), Nurminen (Rakennustyöläisten liitto) and Nestori Ahonen (Puuteollisuustyöväen liitto), were purged. Nurminen resigned from the SAJ executive committee. Kusti Kulo, who was in charge of the SAJ education work, was expelled in June. Still, the Left Group tried to work with the communists. It was suggested that the left, including social democrats, should unite against the far-right Lapua Movement which was terrorizing the organized workers. The SKP did not agree.

In July, all activities of the SAJ and its organizations were banned by the state. Left-wing newspapers were closed and politicians arrested, including members of the Socialist Parliamentary Group of Workers and Smallholders, a joint effort of left socialists and communists. The socialist left, however, participated in the formation of a new SDP-controlled trade union SAK, which, in its early years, was boycotted by the SKP.

== See also ==
- List of Communist Party (Finland) breakaway parties
