= Mauri Tuomela =

Finnish farmer and politician (1870–1945)

Mauri Leopold Tuomela (30 January 1870 – 2 August 1945) was a Finnish farmer and politician, born in Vehkalahti. He was a member of the Parliament of Finland from 1913 to 1916, representing the Finnish Party. He was a presidential elector in the 1925 Finnish presidential election.
