= Industrial Union of Construction and Wood =

Former East German trade union (1950–1990)

The Industrial Union of Construction and Wood (German: Industriegewerkschaft Bau-Holz, IG Bau-Holz) was a trade union representing construction and wood workers in East Germany.

The union was founded in 1950, when the Free German Trade Union Federation (FDGB) merged the Industrial Union of Construction with the Industrial Union of Wood. Its remit also covered toy making, and in 1955, building materials workers were transferred from the Industrial Union of Chemicals. In 1956, workers in local timber and cultural goods trades were transferred to the Industrial Union of the Local Economy, but they returned in 1958.

The union affiliated to the Trade Union International of Building, Wood, Building Materials and Allied Industries, and from 1957, provided its president. The union became involved in sports associations, their names starting with "SV Aufbau".

The union's membership grew over time, and reached 935,208 by 1989. It became independent in February 1990, and dissolved in October. The majority of its remaining members transferred to the Building and Construction Union, but others joined the Wood and Plastic Union, the Horticulture, Agriculture and Forestry Union, or IG Metall.

== Presidents ==
1950: Franz Jahn
1953: Walter Tille
1958: Lothar Lindner
1990: Horst Schulz
