= Minister of Population and Ethnic Affairs (Estonia) =

Estonian cabinet position

Minister of Population and Ethnic Affairs (also Minister of Population; Estonian: Eesti rahvastikuminister) is a minister in the Estonian Government.

In 2009 this office was abolished. In 2019 this office was re-established.

== Ministers ==
- 1997–1999 Andra Veidemann
- 1999–2002 Katrin Saks
- 2002–2003 Eldar Efendijev
- 2003–2007 Paul-Eerik Rummo
- 2007–2009 Urve Palo
- 2019–2021 Riina Solman
