= Paul-Eerik Rummo =

Estonian poet, playwright, translator and politician

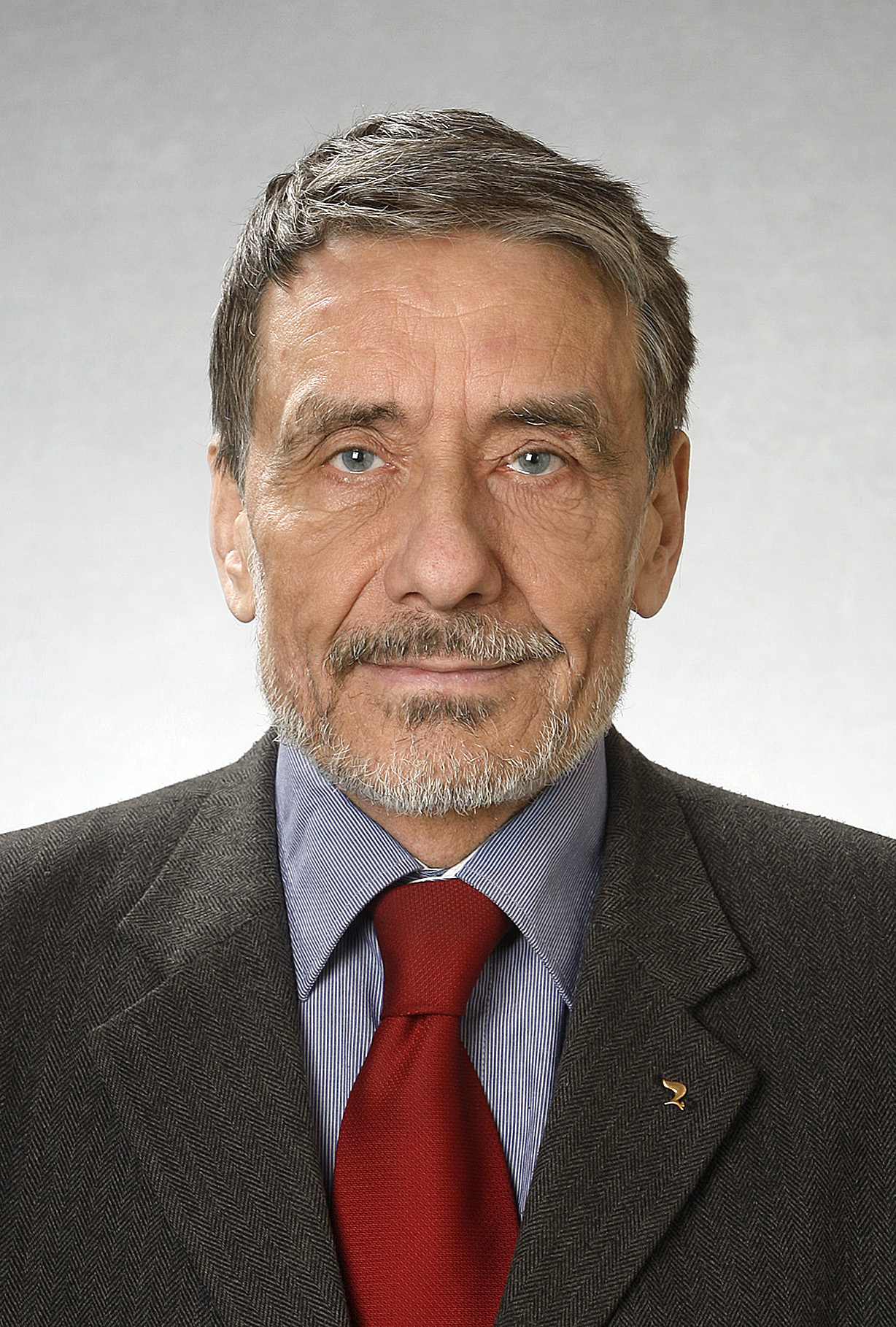
- Paul-Eerik Rummo in 2011.

Minister of Population and Ethnic Affairs
- In office 2003–2007
- Prime Minister: Juhan Parts; Andrus Ansip
- Preceded by: Eldar Efendijev
- Succeeded by: Urve Palo

Minister of Culture and Education
- In office 1992–1994
- Prime Minister: Mart Laar
- Preceded by: Rein Loik
- Succeeded by: Peeter Olesk

Personal details
- Born: 19 January 1942 (age 84) Tallinn, then part of Generalbezirk Estland, Reichskommissariat Ostland
- Spouse: Viiu Härm
- Children: 3

Paul-Eerik Rummo (born 19 January 1942) is an Estonian poet, playwright, translator and politician who was the former Estonian Minister of Culture and Education, as well as the former Estonian Minister of Population Affairs.

Rummo was born in Tallinn, the son of Estonian writer Paul Rummo. Paul-Eerik studied literature at the University of Tartu, graduating in 1965. Rummo has worked in Estonian theatres.

== Personal life ==
Paul-Eerik Rummo is married to the actress, poet, author, and translator Viiu Härm. The couple has three daughters.

== Legacy ==
In October 1980, Rummo was a signatory of the Letter of 40 Intellectuals, a public letter in which forty prominent Estonian intellectuals defended the Estonian language and protested the Russification policies of the Kremlin in Estonia. The signatories also expressed their unease against republic-level government in harshly dealing with youth protests in Tallinn that were sparked a week earlier due to the banning of a public performance of the punk rock band Propeller.

In the novel Purge (in Finnish Puhdistus) by Sofi Oksanen, Rummo's poetry becomes a symbol of resistance against Russification in Estonia, sprinkled throughout the narrative.

== Selected bibliography ==
Poetry

- Ankruhiivaja (The Anchor-weigher), 1962
- Lumevalgus … lumepimedus (Snow Light ... Snow Darkness), 1966
- Saatja aadress ja teised luuletused 1968-1972 (Sender's Address and Other Poems 1968-1972), 1989.
- The September Sun. Facing bilingual with English translations by Ritva Poom. Cross-Cultural Communications, 1994.

Plays

- Tuhkatriinumäng (Cinderellagame), printed 1969

Political offices
Preceded by Rein Loik	Estonian Minister of Culture and Education; 1992–1994	Succeeded by Peeter Olesk
Preceded by Eldar Efendijev	Estonian Minister of Population and Ethnic Affairs; 2003–2007	Succeeded by Urve Palo
