= Aarne Saarinen =

Finnish politician and trade union leader

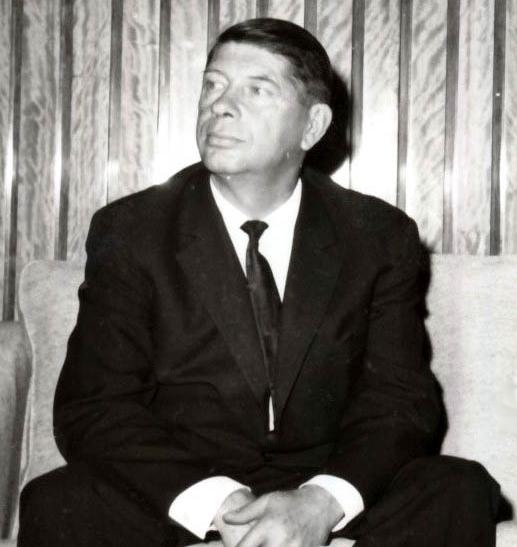
- Aarne Saarinen in Romania 1966
- Born: 5 December 1913; Degerby, Grand Duchy of Finland
- Died: 13 April 1989 (aged 75); Helsinki, Finland
- Occupations: politician, trade union leader
- Years active: 1934–1985
- Known for: Member of the Parliament of Finland (1962–1970, 1972–1983); Chairman of the Communist Party of Finland (1966–1982)

Aarne Armas Saarinen (5 December 1913 – 13 April 1989) was a Finnish communist politician and a trade union leader, who was a member of the Parliament of Finland for the People's Democratic League. He was also the leader of the Communist-led Construction Trade Union 1954–1966, the chairman of the Communist Party of Finland 1966–1982 and the vice-chairman of the People's Democratic League 1976–1985.

== Political views ==
Saarinen was a stonemason who joined the local labor union branch in 1934. During World War II he fought for the Finnish troops. Saarinen was later known as one of the most prominent Communist leaders outside the Eastern Bloc. He was considered as a Eurocommunist who had sceptical views over the Soviet Union. Saarinen condemned the 1968 invasion of Czechoslovakia and during the 1970s, he resisted the efforts of the Stalinist extremists like Taisto Sinisalo to increase the Soviet influence in Finland.

== Other ==
Saarinen was an enthusiastic pipe smoker. In 1988 he founded the ″Society of Considerate Smokers″ together with the Finnish author and film director Jörn Donner.

Trade union offices
Preceded by Yrjö Murto	General Secretary of the Trade Union International of Building, Wood, Building Materials and Allied Industries; 1952–1955	Succeeded by Erkki Salomaa
Preceded by Viljo Rautelin	President of the Construction Trade Union; 1960–1966	Succeeded by Erkki Salomaa
