= Tiit Kubri =

Estonian politician (born 1955)

Tiit Kubri (born 12 July 1955 in Tartu) is an Estonian politician. From 1995 to 1997, he was Minister without portfolio.
