= Yrjö Murto =

Finnish politician and trade unionist

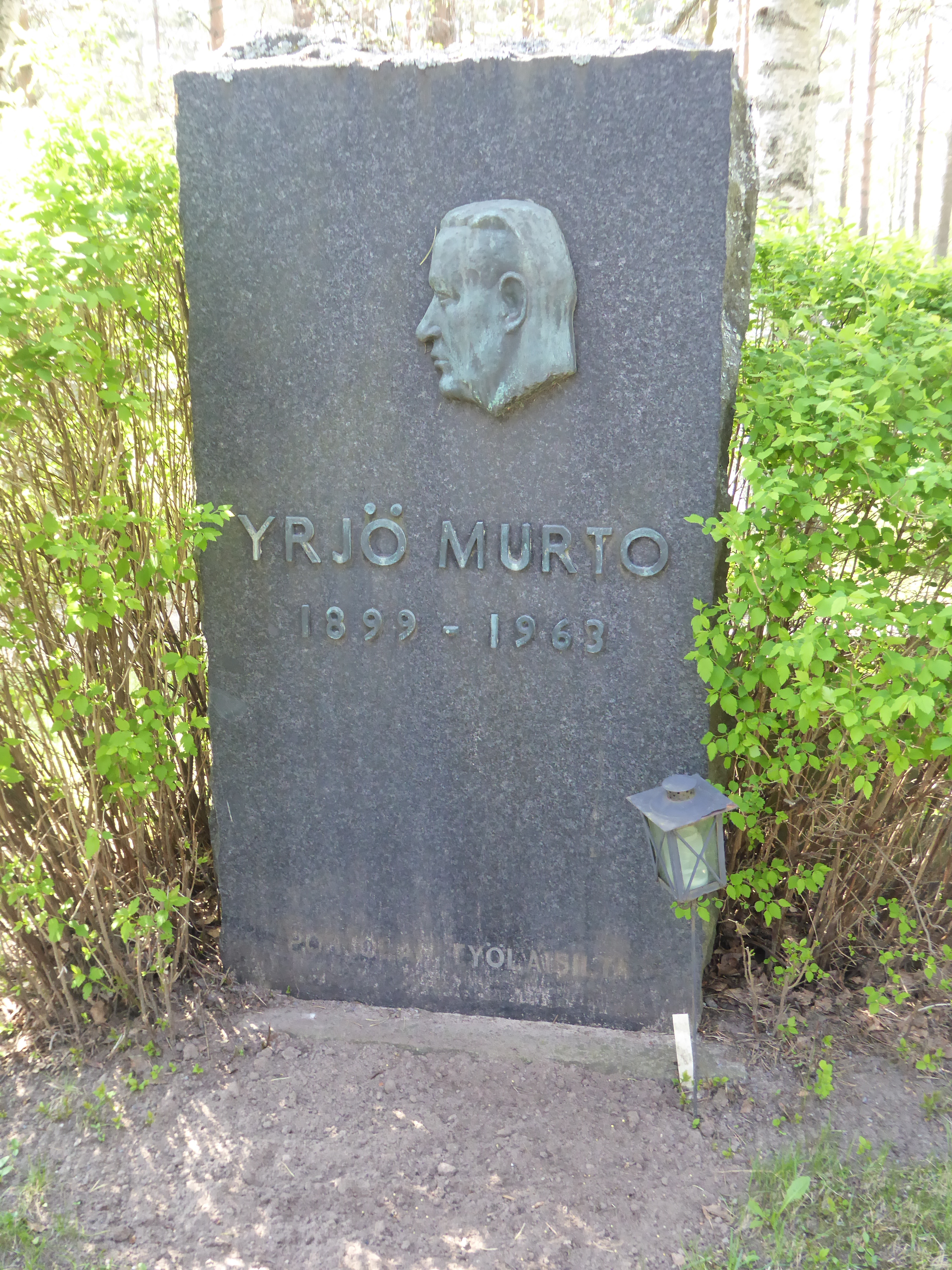

Yrjö Aleksanteri Murto (24 August 1899 – 17 December 1963) was a Finnish communist politician and trade unionist.

Born to a working-class family, Murto became a saw mill worker, and joined both the Finnish Woodworkers' Union and the Finnish Communist Party (SKP). In 1927, he became president of the union, and in 1930 he briefly served as president of the Finnish Trade Union Federation, to which the union was affiliated. The federation and its affiliates were banned, and Murto moved to the Soviet Union to study at the Lenin School.

Murto returned to Finland in 1935, intending to resume political activity, but he was arrested and imprisoned for seven years. On completing his sentence, he was immediately sent to an internment camp, and was finally released in 1944.

Murto was appointed as the SKP's organising secretary for Oulu. In 1945, he entered government as the Deputy Minister of Transport and Public Works, with responsibility for communications, moving in 1946 to become the Deputy Minister of Public Services, with responsibility for social services. The SKP left the government in 1948, Murto being elected as vice-president of the party. He also won a seat in Parliament, and served there for the remainder of his life. From 1949 until 1952, he additionally served as the general secretary of the Trade Union International of Building, Wood, Building Materials and Allied Industries.

Trade union offices
Preceded by Iisakki Heikka	President of the Finnish Trade Union Federation; 1930	Succeeded by Federation banned
Preceded by New position	General Secretary of the Trade Union International of Building, Wood, Building Materials and Allied Industries; 1949–1952	Succeeded by Aarne Saarinen
