= Walter Tille =

German trade union leader

Walter Tille (6 October 1906 – 12 April 1986) was a German trade union leader.

Born in Crimmitschau, Tille worked as a bricklayer. He joined the German Construction Workers' Union and the Socialist Workers' Youth in 1921, and then Social Democratic Party of Germany in 1923. He was frequently arrested for his political activities, and in 1933 fled to Czechoslovakia. However, he returned the following year and worked as a bricklayer again until 1940, when he was drafted into the Wehrmacht.

Tille was interned in Norway in 1945, but escaped back to Germany. There, he joined the Free German Trade Union Federation (FDGB) and the Socialist Unity Party of Germany (SED). He was appointed as head of the Crimmitschau Commission for the Expropriation of Nazi and War Criminals, and was also elected to the city council.

From 1947, Tille worked managing a construction company, and then in the city's civil engineering department, where he developed a quick and cheap method of creating wall and door openings. This brought him increased prominence, and he held various roles in the Industrial Union of Construction, becoming president of the executive of its successor, the Industrial Union of Construction and Wood (IG Bau-Holz), in 1953. From 1954, he was also an FDGB member of the Volkskammer, and from 1957, he was the president of the Trade Union International of Building, Wood, Building Materials and Industries.

In 1958, Tille was appointed as secretary of the FDGB's executive committee, and he also joined the SED's central committee. He left most of his roles in 1962 and 1963, becoming a leader of the centre for innovation in civil engineering. From 1967, he again served on the executive of IG Bau-Holz, representing retired members, and he remained in the post until his death, in 1986.

Trade union offices
Preceded by Franz Jahn	President of the Industrial Union of Construction and Wood; 1953–1958	Succeeded by Lothar Lindner
Preceded by Joseph Kobel	President of the Trade Union International of Building, Wood, Building Materials and Allied Industries; 1957–1960	Succeeded by Lothar Lindner
