= List of mayors of Narva =

The following is a list of mayors of Narva, Estonia.

== List ==
=== Mayor of Narva (Russian Empire) ===
- Adolf Theodor Hahn (1873–1877 and 1882–1884)
- Dmitri Zinovjev (14 December 1878 – 29 December 1881)
- Aleksandr Svinkin (1886–1894)
- Pjotr Pankov (1898–1902)
- Alfons Tatarin (26 November 1902 – 12 March 1910)
- Aleksei Ossipov (25 April 1910 – 21 March 1917)
- Ants Dauman (1917–1918)

=== Mayor of Narva (post-independence) ===
- Eduard Alfred Dieckhoff (1918)
- Albert Tiimann (1918–1919)
- Robert Astrem (1919)
- Anton Võhmar (Võhman) (1921–1922)
- Johannes Hermann (1922–1924)
- Jaan Luts (1924–1927)
- Johannes Hermann (1927–1930)
- Jaan Luts (1930–1936)
- Jaan Lust (1936–1940)

=== Mayor of Narva (German Estonia) ===
- Johan Hansing (1940)
- Leonhard Vahter (1941–1942)
- Richard Rubach (1943)

=== Chairman of the Executive Committee of the Narva City Council of People's Deputies (Estonian SSR) ===
- Vassili Kala (–1946)
- Meta Vannas (1960–1969)
- Aleksandr Zamahhin (1969–1973)
- S. Boborenko (1973–1975)
- Heino Urm (1975–1979)
- Valeri Tšetvergov (1979–1982)
- Eduard Rõžakov (1982–1985)
- Vladimir Mižui (1985–1991)

=== Mayor of Narva (1991-present) ===
- Vladimir Mižui (1991–1993)
- Raivo Murd (1993–1998)
- Eldar Efendijev (1998–2000)
- Imre Liiv (2000–2002)
- Tarmo Tammiste (2002–2013)
- Eduard East (2013–2015)
- Tarmo Tammiste (2015–2019)
- Aleksei Jevgrafov (2019-30 December 2020)
- Katri Raik (30 December 2020–16 September 2023)
- Jaan Toots (5 October 2023)
