= Uno Nurminen =

Finnish politician

Uno Lauri Nurminen (26 January 1895 – 10 August 1972) was a Finnish trade union activist, civil servant and politician, born in Kärkölä. He served as a Member of the Parliament of Finland from 1924 to 1927, representing the Socialist Electoral Organisation of Workers and Smallholders. From 1929 to 1930, he was active in the short-lived Left Group of Finnish Workers. Later, he joined the Social Democratic Party of Finland (SDP) and was elected chairman of the Uusimaa district of the party.

Trade union offices
Preceded by New position	President of the Construction Trade Union; 1924–1930	Succeeded by Tuomas Bryggari
Preceded by Tuomas Bryggari	President of the Construction Trade Union; 1939–1945	Succeeded by Viljo Rautelin
