= Matti Väisänen (politician) =

Finnish politician

Matti Väisänen (25 February 1887, in Kaavi – 24 April 1939) was a Finnish trade union activist and politician. He sided with the Reds during the Finnish Civil War in 1918 and after the defeat of the Red side he fled to Soviet Russia, from where he returned to Finland in 1919. Väisänen was the chairman of the Finnish Trade Union Federation (SAJ) from 1920 to 1923. He served as a Socialist Workers' Party of Finland (SSTP) Member of the Parliament of Finland from 5 September until 20 December 1922, when he lost his seat. He was imprisoned on sedition charges in 1923. In the 1925 Finnish presidential election, while still in prison, he was the presidential candidate of the Socialist Electoral Organisation of Workers and Smallholders, receiving 6.6% of the vote. From 1929 to 1930, he was active in the short-lived Left Group of Finnish Workers.
