= Lothar Lindner =

German trade unionist

- Born: 13 January 1928; Chemnitz, Weimar Germany
- Occupation: Trade union leader
- Political party: SED

Lothar Lindner (born 13 January 1928) is a former German trade union leader. He was chairman of the central committee of the building and timber industry union in the East German Free German Trade Union Federation (FDGB / Freier Deutscher Gewerkschaftsbund ) and President of the International Federation of Unions in the building, timber and building materials industries in the World Federation of Trade Unions (WFTU).

== Life ==
Lindner was born in Saxony, the child of a bricklayer and a waitress. On completing his schooling, in 1942 he started an apprenticeship as a bricklayer. However, in 1944 he was drafted as an air-force assistant. He returned to and completed his apprenticeship in 1945/46, and started work as a bricklayer, working on construction sites in Limbach and Chemnitz.

With the re-establishment of trade unions, in June 1945 Lindner joined the Building Industry Union and the FDGB. In the same year his co-workers elected him to the works council and as the youth spokesman in the local Building Workers' committee. In 1947 he joined the country's ruling Socialist Unity Party of Germany (SED / Sozialistische Einheitspartei Deutschlands). From January 1947 he served as youth secretary to the regional executive in Saxony of the building and timber workers' union (IG Bau-Holz), and then in 1947/48 became head of the youth and training department of the FDGB before becoming, in 1948/49 Secretary for Training in the National/Central Executive of the union.

In 1949 he attended a training course at the national FDGB school at Bernau near Berlin. From January 1950 till 1951 Lindner was Chairman of the Saxony-Anhalt regional committee of IG Bau-Holz, then becoming, in January 1951, deputy chairman and a secretariat member of the union's central committee. In October 1953, however, he was removed from his position as deputy chairman and received a formal warning (Partreistrafe) from The Party on account of a "false assessment" in June 1953 and for his "support of the programme of demands put forward by the IG Bau-Holz union" in July 1953.

In 1954/55 Lindner was sent for a year to the prestigious Karl Marx Academy. Then between 1956 and 1963 he undertook a correspondence degree course with The Academy which led to a degree in Social Sciences. After that he worked as the deputy department leader (1955–57) and as the department leader and executive departmental head (1957/58) on the national committee of the FDGB. From 1958 right up until February 1990 Lindner was also chairman of the national committee for his union, IG Bau-Holz in succession to Walter Tille.

Between 1956 and December 1989 he was also member of the National Executive of the FDGB. He was a member of the secretariat from 1959 and again from 1968 till November 1989. He was also a presidium member.

Beyond his national functions, from 1960 till October 1990 served as president of the International Confederation of Trade Unions and Workers in the Building, Timber and Building Materials Industries within the WFTU. From 1961 till 1990 he was also a member of the WFTU General Council. In his presidential capacity he took part in seven meetings of the Committee for Public Building Works as well as working on Forestry and Timber industry matters at the International Labour Organization in Geneva.

In 1976 Lothar Lindner was nominated as a candidate for membership of the ruling SED (party) central Committee. He was appointed to Central Committee membership in 1981.

== Awards ==
- 1964 Patriotic Order of Merit Bronze
- 1974 Hero of Labour (GDR)
- 1978 Patriotic Order of Merit Silver
- 1979 Honoured Building Worker of the German Democratic Republic
- 1985 Fritz Heckert Medal (gold)
- 1988 Patriotic Order of Merit Gold

== Publications (not a complete list) ==
- Die Aufgaben der Industriegewerkschaft Bau-Holz bei der Organisierung und Führung des sozialistischen Wettbewerbes zu Ehren des 15. Jahrestages der DDR und zur Verwirklichung des Grundsatzes „Neue Technik – neue Normen“ sowie die Anwendung ökonomisch zweckmäßiger Lohnformen im Jahre 1964. IG Bau-Holz, Berlin 1964.
- Die Aufgaben der Industriegewerkschaft Bau-Holz bei der Organisierung und Führung des sozialistischen Wettbewerbes und der weiteren Durchsetzung des sozialistischen Leistungsprinzips zur Erfüllung des Volkswirtschaftsplanes 1965 in Verbindung mit den Gewerkschaftswahlen. Zentralvorstand der IG Bau-Holz, Berlin 1965.
- Die Aufgaben der Industriegewerkschaft Bau-Holz in Auswertung der Funktionärskonferenz des Bundesvorstandes des FDGB und der 7. Baukonferenz zur Erhöhung des Niveaus der politisch-ideologischen Arbeit und Führung des sozialistischen Wettbewerbes zum X. Parteitag der SED. Zentralvorstand der IG Bau-Holz, Berlin 1980.
- Der 17. Juni und die IG Bau-Holz. Berlin 1992 (Maschinenschrift).
- (zusammen mit Hermann Hunger, Red.): Die Industriegewerkschaft Bau in der sowjetischen Besatzungszone 1945 bis 1949, die Industriegewerkschaft Bau-Holz in der Deutschen Demokratischen Republik 1950 bis 1990. (= Im Rückblick, Band I). Bundesvorstand der Industriegewerkschaft Bauen-Agrar-Umwelt, Frankfurt am Main 1997.
- (zusammen mit Hermann Hunger, Red.): Die Industriegewerkschaft Bau in Groß-Berlin von 1945 bis 1950. (= Im Rückblick, Band II). Bundesvorstand der Industriegewerkschaft Bauen-Agrar-Umwelt, Frankfurt am Main 1997.
- (zusammen mit Hermann Hunger, Red.): Die Industriegewerkschaft Bau-Holz, Mitglied der Internationalen Vereinigung der Gewerkschaften der Beschäftigten der Bau-, Holz- und Baumaterialienindustrie im Weltgewerkschaftsbund von 1949 bis 1990. (= Im Rückblick, Band III). Bundesvorstand der Industriegewerkschaft Bauen-Agrar-Umwelt, Frankfurt am Main 1997.
- (zusammen mit Hermann Hunger, Red.): Die Interzonenkonferenzen der Baugewerkschaften und der Landarbeitergewerkschaften Deutschlands von 1947 bis 1948. (= Im Rückblick, Band IV). Bundesvorstand der Industriegewerkschaft Bauen-Agrar-Umwelt, Frankfurt am Main 1998.
- (zusammen mit Hermann Hunger, Red.): Die Industriegewerkschaft Land- und Forstwirtschaft in der sowjetischen Besatzungszone 1945 bis 1949, die Gewerkschaft Land und Forst – ab 1968 Gewerkschaft Land, Nahrungsgüter und Forst – in der Deutschen Demokratischen Republik bis 1990. (= Im Rückblick, Band V). Bundesvorstand der Industriegewerkschaft Bauen-Agrar-Umwelt, Frankfurt am Main 2000.

Trade union offices
Preceded by Walter Tille	President of the Industrial Union of Construction and Wood; 1958–1990	Succeeded by Horst Schulz
Preceded by Walter Tille	President of the Trade Union International of Building, Wood, Building Materials and Allied Industries; 1960–1990	Succeeded by Robert Brun
