= Katri Raik =

Estonian politician (born 1967)

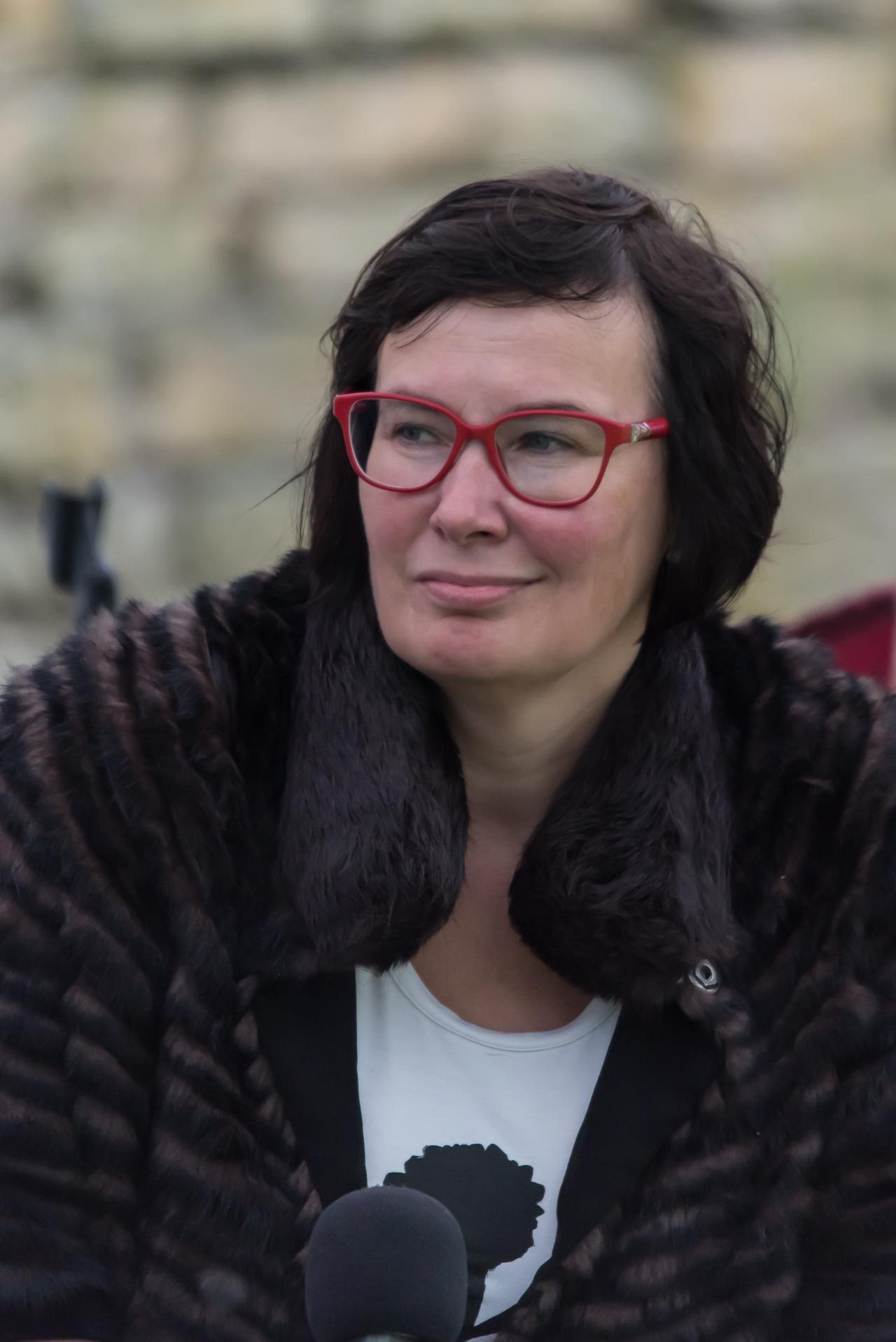

Minister of the Interior
- In office 26 November 2018 – 29 April 2019
- Prime Minister: Jüri Ratas
- Preceded by: Andres Anvelt
- Succeeded by: Mart Helme

Mayor of Narva
- In office 30 December 2020 – 16 September 2023
- Preceded by: Aleksei Jevgrafov
- Succeeded by: Jaan Toots

Personal details
- Born: 26 October 1967 (age 58) Tartu, then part of Estonian SSR, Soviet Union
- Party: Social Democratic Party
- Education: University of Tartu

Katri Raik (born 26 October 1967) is an Estonian politician who served as the Minister of the Interior from 2018 to 2019 and intermittently served as the Mayor of Narva for three separate periods since 2020. She is a member of the Social Democratic Party. She was a Member of Riigikogu from 2018 to 2019 and the rector of the Estonian Academy of Security Sciences before she joined the government.
