= Katrin Saks =

Estonian politician and journalist

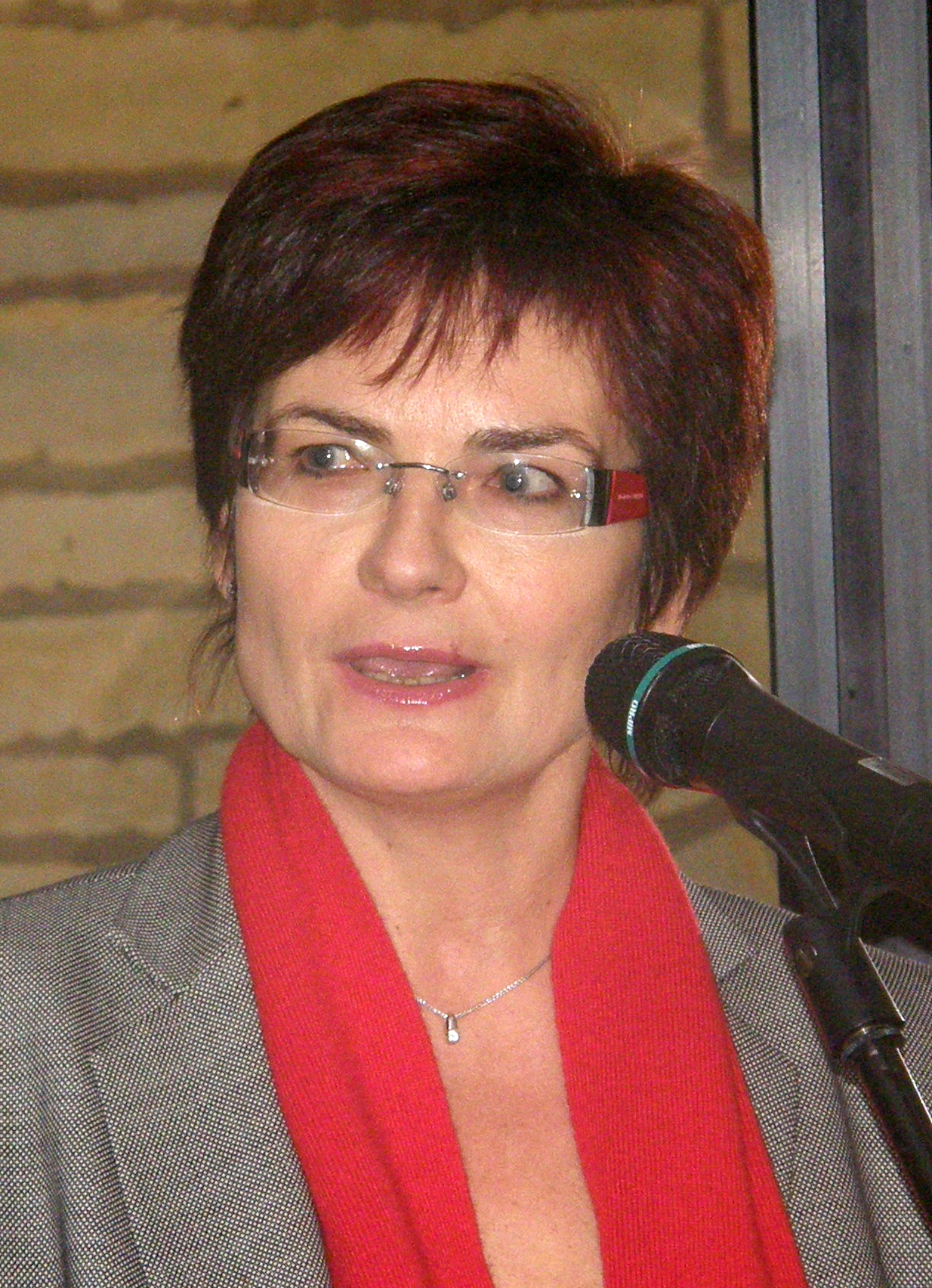
- Katrin Saks in 2007.

Minister of Population and Ethnic Affairs
- In office 1999–2002
- Prime Minister: Mart Laar
- Preceded by: Andra Veidemann
- Succeeded by: Eldar Efendijev

Personal details
- Born: 29 November 1956 (age 69) Tallinn, then part of Estonian SSR, Soviet Union
- Party: Social Democratic Party

Katrin Saks (born 29 November 1956 in Tallinn) is an Estonian politician and journalist. From 1999 to 2002, she was Minister of Population and Ethnic Affairs in the cabinet of Mart Laar. She was the vice-chairwoman of the Social Democratic Party from 2005 to 2010. In October 2006 she became Member of the European Parliament, replacing Toomas Hendrik Ilves, who had been elected President of Estonia. She lost her seat in the 2009 European election, but shortly regained it, when on 7 April 2014 she replaced Ivari Padar who became Estonian Minister for Agriculture, until in July she was succeeded by Marju Lauristin following the 2014 European election. As of 2011, she is a director of Tallinn University Baltic Film and Media School.

== Education ==
- Estonian Diplomatic College, international relations and diplomacy (1993)
- University of Tartu, journalism (1981)
- Additional courses in Denmark, Norway, Belgium and the USA.

== Professional Background ==
- Director of Baltic Film and Media School (2011–currently)
- Concordia International University, lecturer (1998–2000)
- Open Estonia Fund, project manager (1998–1999)
- Estonian Television, programme director, member of the Board of Governors (1993–1997)
- Estonian Television, journalist (1977–1997)

== Political Work ==
- Member of the European Parliament, Socialist Group (2006–2009; April–June 2014)
- Member of the Estonian Parliament (2003–2006),
- Member, European Union Affairs Committee; Vice-chairman, Cultural Affairs Committee
- Member, Estonian delegation to the Parliamentary Assembly of the Council of Europe,

rapporteur on Finno-Ugric peoples in the Russian Federation (2003–2006)

- Government of the Republic of Estonia, minister (1999–2002)

== Organisations ==
- Mõõdukad Party (predecessor of the SDE) (1988), Vice-Chairman, SDE Party (2005).
- Member, Broadcasting Council
- Board of Trustees of Tartu University
- Board of Trustees of the Estonian Music Academy
- President, Union for Child Welfare

== Awards ==
- 2006: Order of the White Star, 4th class

Political offices
Preceded by Andra Veidemann	Estonian Minister of Population and Ethnic Affairs; 1999–2002	Succeeded by Eldar Efendijev
