= Tauno Suontausta =

Finnish supervisory counsellor and lawyer

Tauno Erland Suontausta (18 February 1907, in Turku – 7 November 1974, in Helsinki) was a Finnish supervisory counsellor and a lawyer. Suontausta was the Chargé d'Affaires of Finland to Slovakia from 1943 to 1944, before becoming the Docent of International Law at the University of Helsinki, from 1948 to 1958.

Suontausta was the Minister of Justice in the Fagerholm I Cabinet as a member of the Social Democratic Party of Finland, from 1948 to 1950.

Suontausta had a significant background role as a legal adviser to President Paasikivi. He was especially important in dealing with Stalin's proposal for the Finno-Soviet Treaty in the late winter of 1948.

He was Secretary General of the Finnish Negotiation Delegation in Moscow in March–April 1948, which was considering the Finno-Soviet Treaty.

His brother Yrjö Suontausta was a member of the Supreme Court since 1947 and a Member of parliament from the National Progressive Party from 1945 to 1947.
