= Aleksei Jevgrafov =

Estonian politician (born 1979)

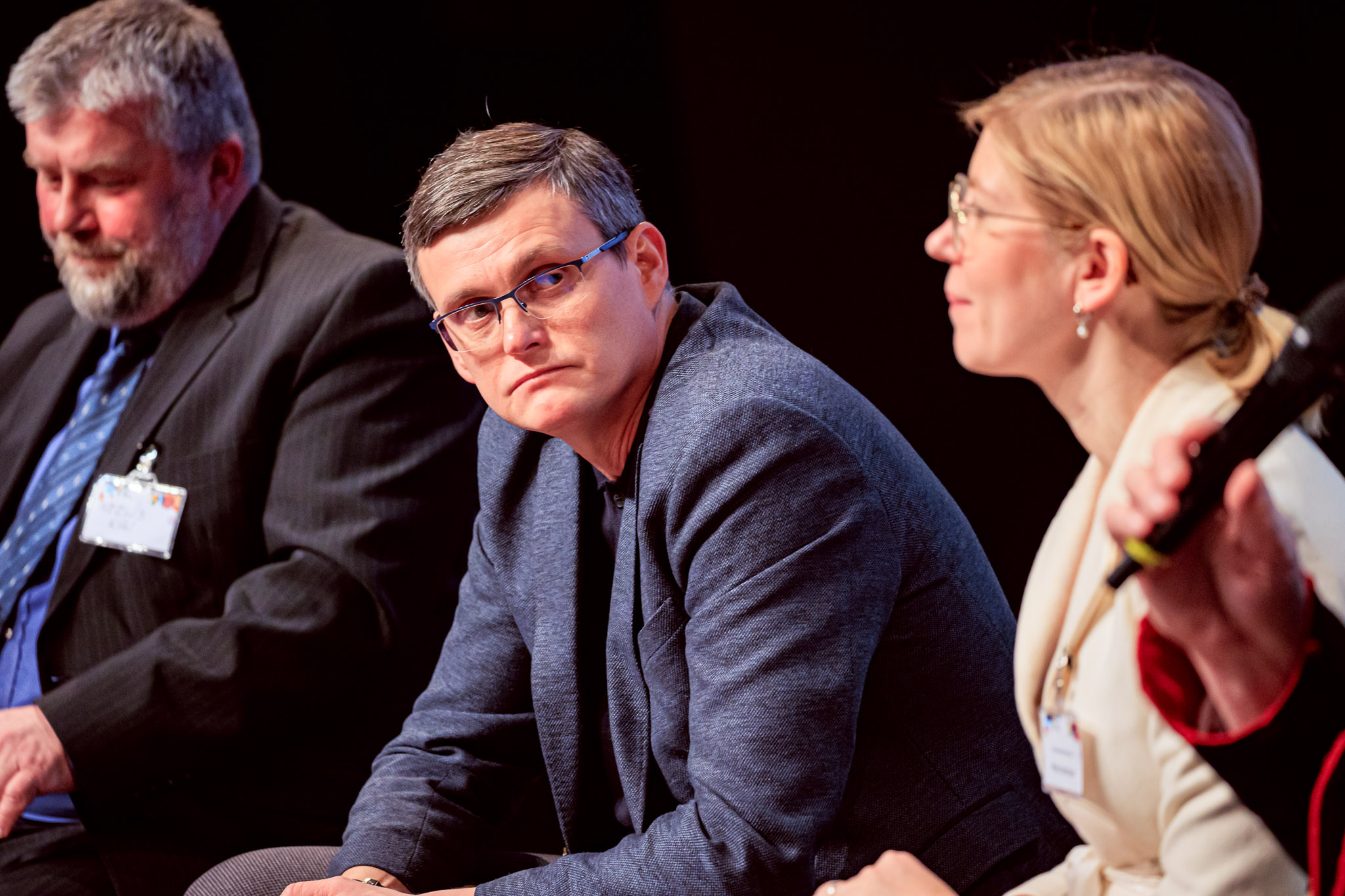

Mayor of Narva
- In office 8 April 2019 – 11 November 2020
- Preceded by: Tarmo Tammiste
- Succeeded by: Katri Raik

Personal details
- Born: November 24, 1979 (age 46) Narva, then part of Estonian SSR, Soviet Union
- Party: Estonian Reform Party (2001–2006)
- Children: 2
- Education: Tallinn University

Aleksei Jevgrafov (born November 24, 1979) is an Estonian politician, and as of April 5, 2023, he is a member of the XV Riigikogu.

== Biography ==
He graduated from Narva Pähklimäe Gymnasium in 1998 and in 2002, he completed his studies in public administration at Tallinn Pedagogical University.

He was a member of the Reform Party from December 4, 2001, to January 1, 2006.

From November 7, 2017, to March 15, 2019, Jevgrafov served as the Deputy Mayor of Narva in charge of city management. On March 15, he became the Acting Mayor of Narva, and from April 8, 2019, to November 11, 2020, he held the position of Mayor of Narva.

However, on November 11, 2020, the Narva City Council passed a vote of no confidence in him, with 17 out of 31 council members supporting the decision.

From December 6, 2020, to March 10, 2021, he served as the director of Narva Hospital.

Starting from 2021, he has been a member of the Narva City Council.

In the 2023 parliamentary elections, he ran for the Riigikogu and received 1405 votes in the electoral district number 7 (Ida-Viru County), which was the fourth-highest result in the county. He became a substitute member of the Riigikogu.

Jevgrafov is married and has two sons.
