= Industrial Union of Chemicals, Glass and Ceramics =

Former East German trade union (1946–1991)

The Industrial Union of Chemicals, Glass and Ceramics (German: Industriegewerkschaft Chemie, Glas und Keramik, IG CGK) was a trade union representing workers in various industries in East Germany.

The union was founded by the Free German Trade Union Federation in 1946, initially as the Industrial Union of Chemicals, Paper, Stone and Earth. It initially had 230,464 members. In 1947, its name was changed to the Industrial Union of Chemicals, Paper and Ceramics, and then in 1950 it was shortened to the Industrial Union of Chemicals.

The remit of the union also changed over the years. In 1955, its members in the building materials sector were transferred to the Industrial Union of Construction and Wood, and in 1956 various members moved to the Industrial Union of the Local Economy, although they returned in 1958. The biggest changes came in 1957, when the union's headquarters moved from Berlin to Halle, and its members in textile manufacturing and forestry were transferred to other unions.

Internationally, the union affiliated to the Trade Unions International of Chemical, Oil and Allied Workers. The union became involved in sports associations, their names starting with "SV Chemie".

The membership of the union continued to change until the 1972, when it also adopted its final name, the "Industrial Union of Chemicals, Glass and Ceramics". In addition to these areas, it also represented workers in the paper and petroleum industries, and in waste disposal.

By 1989, the union had 531,301 members. It became independent in April 1990. It began working closely with the Chemical, Paper and Ceramic Union, and gradually merged into it, completing the process in June 1991.

== Presidents ==
1950: Kurt Kühn
1952: Horst Willim
1958: Rudolf Höppner
1965: Hans-Joachim Winkler
1967: Werner Oertelt
1980: Edith Weber
1989: Hartmut Löschner
