= Erkki Salomaa =

Erkki Salomaa (16 October 1917 – 11 November 1971) was a Finnish communist activist, researcher and trade union leader.

Born in Jyväskylä, Salomaa was brought up by his grandmother, in Tampere. He began working as a glazier when he was 14 years old, and studied part-time at the Workers' Academy and then the University of Tampere.

Salomaa became active in the Finnish Communist Party (SKP), and was imprisoned from 1940 until 1944 for his activity in the Workers' Front movement. After the war, he became prominent in the Construction Trade Union. In 1947, he published the Trade Union Book, Part 1, intended as a university-level guide to the trade union movement.

From 1955 until 1960, Salomaa served as general secretary of the Trade Union International of Building, Wood, Building Materials and Allied Industries. He then became the principal of Sirola College. From 1967 until 1970, he was the president of the Construction Trade Union.

From 1966 until his death, Salomaa was the deputy chair of the SKP. He opposed the Soviet invasion of Czechoslovakia in 1968, and this made him unpopular with the more orthodox sections of the party. In 1971, Salomaa committed suicide.

Trade union offices
Preceded by Aarne Saarinen	General Secretary of the Trade Union International of Building, Wood, Building Materials and Allied Industries; 1955–1960	Succeeded by Veikko Porkkala
Preceded by Aarne Saarinen	President of the Construction Trade Union; 1967–1970	Succeeded by Aarno Aitamurto
