= Trade Union International of Building, Wood, Building Materials and Allied Industries =

UITBB
- Trade Union International of Building, Wood, Building Materials and Allied Industries
- Formation: July 1949; 76 years ago
- Type: Trade union international
- Affiliations: World Federation of Trade Unions
- Website: https://uitbb.org/

The Trade Union International of Building, Wood, Building Materials and Allied Industries, also known as the Trade Union International of Construction, Wood, Building Materials and Allied Industries, more commonly known by its French acronym UITBB (Union internationale des syndicats des travailleurs du bâtiment, du bois et des matériaux de construction) is a trade union international affiliated with the World Federation of Trade Unions.

== History ==
The UITBB was founded at a conference in Milan in 14–16 July 1949.

== Organization ==
The highest organization is the Conference which meets every 4 years. Between conferences, the union is run by an administrative committee. The committee elections the president, vice-presidents, secretary general and secretaries, who constitute the executive bureau. The secretariat is made up of the secretary general and secretaries who ran the day-to-day activities of the organization.

The organisation's headquarters was in Helsinki from at least 1955. Its address that year was reported to be Kainsaniamenk 5 A 14. In 1957 it was reported to be headquartered at 28B Fredrikinkatu, Box 281. By 1978 it was listed at Fredrikinkatu F28B13 Box10281, 00101 Helskini. From 1985, the address was only listed as Post-office box 281 Helskini. The headquarters have since moved to Nicosia in Cyprus.

== Membership ==
In 1978 the UITBB claimed 15 million members in 52 affiliated unions in 42 countries. In 1985 this had grown to 17 million members in 72 unions in 57 countries. By 2003, this had fallen to 2 million workers in 50 countries, growing again by 2020 to 2.5 million workers in 60 countries.

Member organizations as of 1978 included:

- Austria - Left Bloc of the Union of Construction and Woodworkers
- Benin - Syndicat National des Travailleurs du Batiment, du Bois et des Materiaux de Construction
- Bolivia - Confederación Sindical de Trabajadores en Construcciones
- Chile - Federación Industrial Nacional de la Edification, Madera, y Materiales de Construccion (in exile)
- Colombia - Federación Nacional de Trabojadores de la Industria de la Construccion, Cemento, y Materiales de Construccion
- Congo - Fédération Syndicale des Travailleurs du Batiment et Travaux Publics
- Costa Rica - Sindicato Nacional de Trabajadores de Construccion, Madera y Materiales de Construccion
- Cuba - Sindicato Nacional de Trabajadores de los Construccion
- Cyprus - Cyprus Building Wood General Workers Trade Union PEO
- Ecuador - Fédération de Trabajadores de la Construccion del Guayas
- Finland - Construction Trade Union
- France - National Federation of Construction Workers
- France - Fédération nationale des Travailleurs du Bois et des Parties Similaires
- Guadeloupe - Syndicat CGTG des Travailleurs du Batiment, des Travaux Publics et Activities Annexes
- Hungary - Construction, Wood and Building Materials Industries Workers Union
- India - Mysore Cements Employees Association
- India - Central PWD Workers Union
- India - Public Works Department (Union), Mazdoor Sabah of Uttar Pradesh
- Iraq - General Union of Building and Construction Workers
- Italy - Italian Federation of Wood, Building and Industry Workers
- Jordan - General Syndicate of Building, Wood, Building Materials and Allied Industries (in exile)
- Japan - All Japan Dayworkers Union
- Japan - All Construction Ministry Workers Union
- Japan - KENKOUROU
- Japan - KOKKOROSSO
- North Korea - Construction and Forestry Workers Union
- Lebanon - Union Interproffessionnelle des Travailleurs du Batiment du Bois et des Materiaux du Construction
- Madagascar - Syndicat de la Metallurgie, du Bois et du Batiment
- Mali - Syndicat National de l'Industrie du Batiment et des Materiaux du Construction
- Martinique - Syndicat des Ouviers du Batiment
- Mongolia - Syndicat des Travailleurs de l'Industrie et du Batiment
- Nigeria - Public Work Construction Technical and General Workers Union
- Panama - Fédération Nacional de Trabajadores de la Construccion, Madera, Materiales de la Construction y Ramas Afines
- Peru - Fédération de Trabajadores en Construccion Civil
- Portugal - Federação Portuguesa Sindicatos Da Constr. Cerâmica E Vidro - FEVICCOM
- Romania - Union des Syndicat du Batiment de l'Industrie des Materiaux du Construction
- Romania - Union des Syndicat des Enterprises de l'Economie Forestiere
- Sierra Leone - General Construction Workers Union
- Sri Lanka - Industrial and General Workers Union Workers Union
- Sri Lanka - Mercantile and Local Industries Employees Union
- Syria - Professional Federation of Building, and Wood Workers Trade Union
- Togo - Syndicat du Batiment et des Travaux Publics Prives
- Uruguay - Sindicato Unico Nacional de Trabajadores de la Construccion y Anexos
- Vietnam - Vietnam National Union of Building Workers
- South Yemen - General Union for the Workers of Building, Services and Light Industries

== Publications ==
The union published Information Bulletin quarterly in English, French, Spanish, Russian, German, Swedish and Finnish. According to one source it also published a "brief information circulars" five or six times a year. Another sources says it published "new briefs on a fortnightly basis.

== Leadership ==
=== General Secretaries ===
1949: Yrjö Murto
1952: Aarne Saarinen
1955: Erkki Salomaa
1960: Veikko Porkkala
1983: Mauri Perä (Finland)
1992: Jose Dinis (Portugal)
2012-2016: Debanjan Chakrabarti (India)
2016-Present Day: Michalis Papanikolaou (Cyprus)

=== Presidents ===
Joseph Kobel
1957: Walter Tille
1960: Lothar Lindner
1990: Robert Brun
2020-2025: Daniel Diverio (SUNCA-Uruguay)
2025-Present Day: Javier Diaz (SUNCA-Uruguay)
