= Emil Huunonen =

Finnish trade union leader and politician (1901–1959)

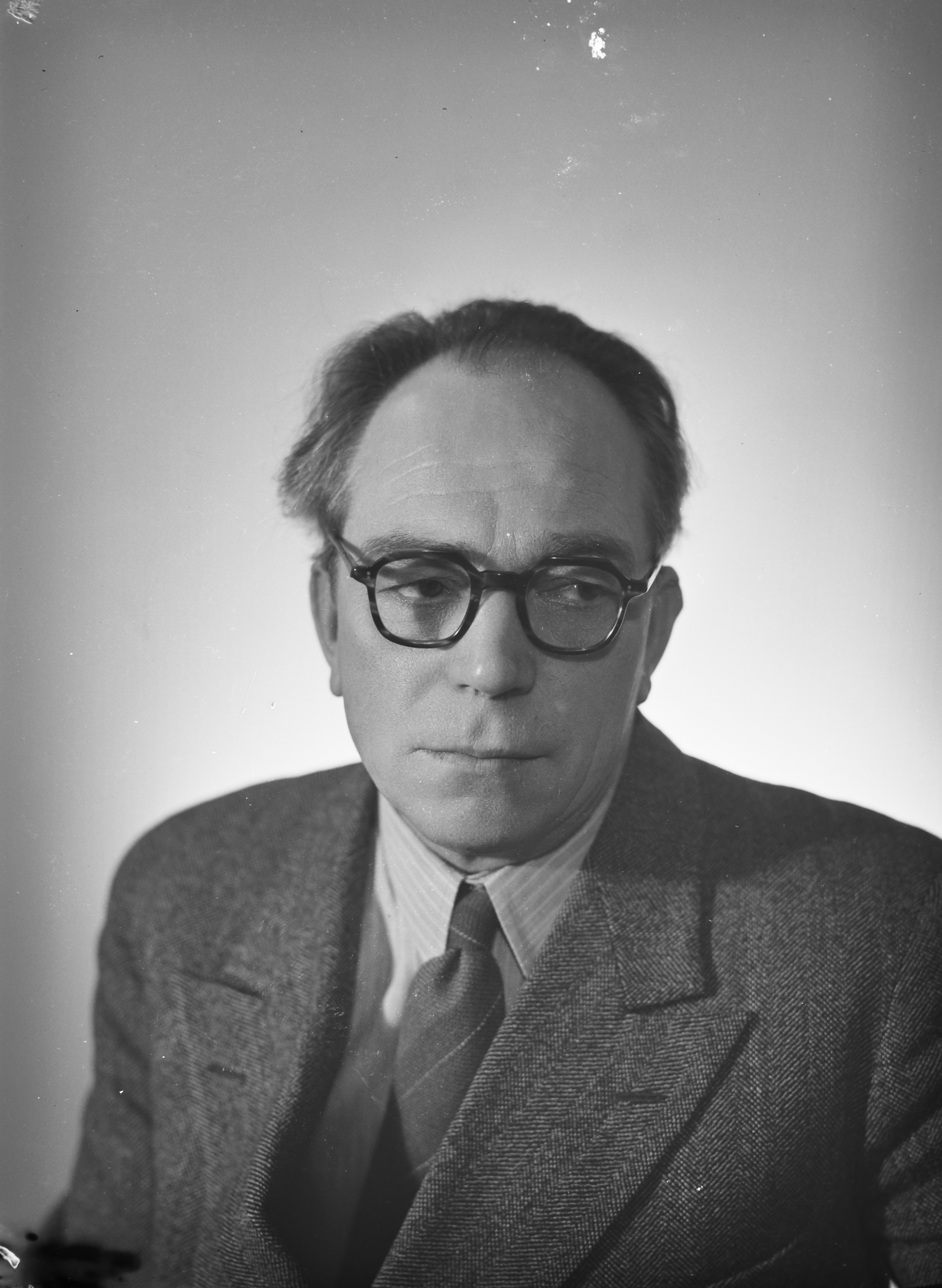
Emil Huunonen in 1950

Emil Huunonen (15 July 1901 – 12 September 1959) was a Finnish trade union leader and politician, born in Johannes. He was a member of the Parliament of Finland from 1948 to 1954, representing the Social Democratic Party of Finland (SDP). He served as Deputy Minister of People's Service from 29 July 1949 to 17 March 1950, as Deputy Minister of Transport and Public Works from 29 July 1949 to 17 March 1950, from 20 September to 29 November 1952 and from 3 December 1952 to 9 July 1953, as Deputy Minister of Social Affairs from 29 July 1949 to 17 March 1950 and from 17 January 1951 to 9 July 1953 and as Minister of Transport and Public Works from 29 November to 3 December 1952. Huunonen was the president of the Finnish Federation of Trade Unions (SAK) from 1946 to 1949. He was a presidential elector in the 1950 Finnish presidential election.
