= Onni Toivonen =

Finnish cooperative organizer and politician (1894–1968)

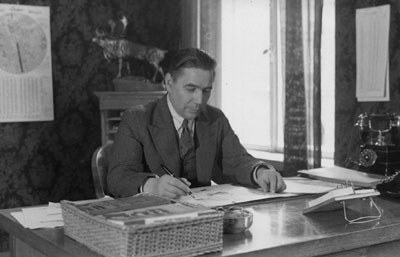
Onni Toivonen

Onni Kustaa Toivonen (18 March 1894 – 12 June 1968) was a Finnish cooperative organizer and politician, born in Pori. He was a member of the Social Democratic Party of Finland (SDP). He served as Minister of People's Service and Deputy Minister of Trade and Industry from 29 August 1948 to 17 March 1950. During the Finnish Civil War of 1918, Toivonen worked in the administration of the Finnish Socialist Workers' Republic. For this, he was given a prison sentence of seven years after the defeat of the Red side. However, in 1920, he was pardoned.
