= Arvo Niitenberg =

Estonian politician

Arvo Niitenberg (27 September 1934 Tallinn – 16 July 2003) is an Estonian technical scientist, politician and diplomat. From 1992 until 1995, he was Minister of Energy.
