= Veikko Porkkala =

Finnish politician (1908–2009)

Veikko Ilmari Porkkala (22 November 1908 – 3 September 2009) was a Finnish communist activist and trade unionist.

Born in Loviisa, Porkkala's father was a utopian socialist who joined the Red Guards. He was killed in 1918, and the 9-year-old Porkkala discovered his body.

The family moved to Porvoo, then Lahti, and then at the age of 14, Porkkala left for Helsinki, to become an artists' assistant. He later became a carpenter, and in 1927 he joined the Finnish Woodworkers' Union. He also became interested in communism, and in 1932, he joined the Finnish Communist Party (SKP). In 1933, he was convicted of secretly distributing party propaganda, and sentenced to forced labour, being released early in 1935.

In 1937, Porkkala spent a year working for the Woodworkers' Union, but he soon returned to carpentry. However, in 1938, he lost four fingers in an accident. Unable to find work, he set up his own woodwork shop in Helsinki. Because of his injury, he was not involved in the Winter War, and was given responsibility for relations between the SKP and the Swedish Communist Party. He was arrested in 1940 and imprisoned until 1944.

In 1945, Porkkala was made chair of the SKP's Helsinki district, and soon also became district secretary. He remained prominent in a number of party roles until 1960, when he was elected as general secretary of the Trade Union International of Building, Wood, Building Materials and Allied Industries, holding the post until his retirement, in 1983.

In retirement, Porkkala dedicated much of his time to painting, and the first exhibition of his artwork was held at the Kallio Library, to celebrate his 100th birthday.

Trade union offices
Preceded by Erkki Salomaa	General Secretary of the Trade Union International of Building, Wood, Building Materials and Allied Industries; 1960–1983	Succeeded by Mauri Perä
