= Peeter Olesk (politician) =

Estonian literary scholar (1953–2021)

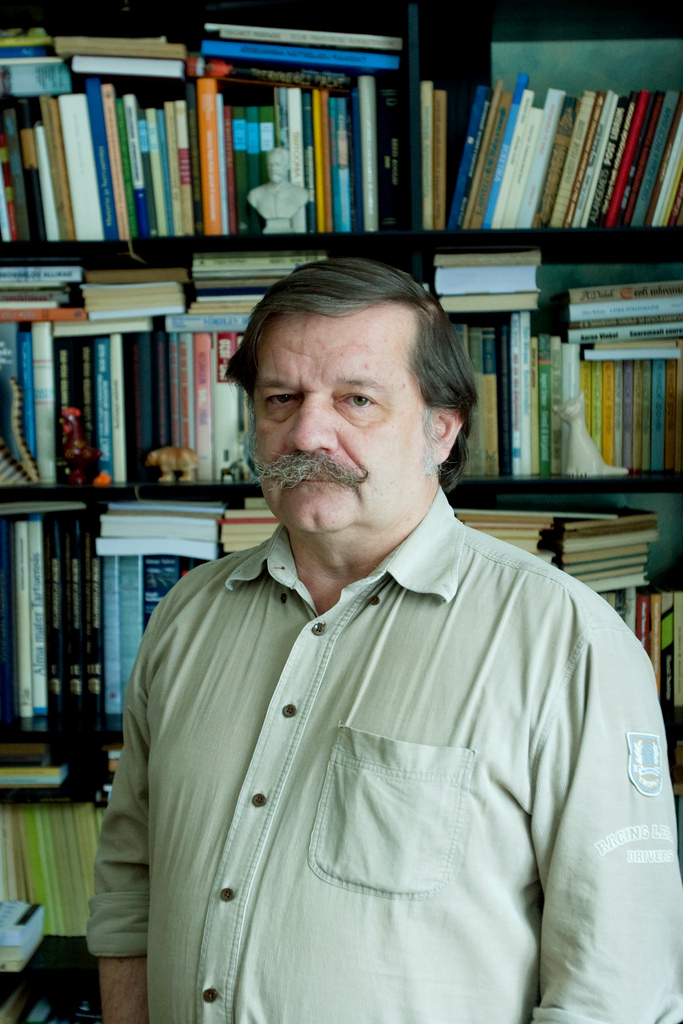
Peeter Olesk

Peeter Olesk (25 December 1953 – 25 November 2021) was an Estonian literary scholar and politician.

Olesk was born in Tallinn on 25 December 1953. In 1972, he graduated from University of Tartu in philology.

From 1990 to 1993, he was the director of Estonian Literary Museum. From 1995 to 1999 he was the director of Tartu University Library. From 1993 to 1994, he was Minister of Population, and from 1994 to 1995 Minister of Culture.

He died on 25 November 2021, at the age of 67.
