= Finnish Trade Union Federation =

Worker coalition in the Nordic state

SAJ
- Finnish Trade Union Federation
- Suomen Ammattijärjestö
- Founded: 1907
- Dissolved: 1930
- Location: Finland
- Members: 110,000 (1917)

Finnish Trade Union Federation (Finnish: Suomen Ammattijärjestö, SAJ; Swedish: Finlands Landsorganisation, FLO) was the first central organisation of trade unions in Finland, established in 1907. It was a part of the Social Democratic Party of Finland (SDP), all union members were also party members. SAJ's membership peaked at 110,000 in 1917. Finnish Trade Union Federation was a member of the International Secretariat of National Trade Union Centres since 1909.

== History ==
In the 1918 Finnish Civil War the Red Guards were mostly composed of SAJ members. It was also one of the organizations forming the Supreme Workers' Council which was the parliament of Red Finland. After the Civil War, the radical SAJ members established the Socialist Workers' Party of Finland (SSTP) in May 1920. The main force behind SSTP was the illegal Communist Party, and a year later the Communists gained a majority in SAJ.

After the rise of the extremist right-wing Lapua Movement, the SAJ was banned in 1930 due to the newly passed Communist Law. The Communists then founded the shortly-lived Red Trade Union and the Social Democrats the Finnish Federation of Trade Unions (SAK). In 1960, the dissident SAK members formed another central organization which was also called SAJ. The new organization and SAK merged in 1969, forming the present-day Central Organisation of Finnish Trade Unions.

== List of chairmen ==
- Eero Haapalainen 1907–1911
- Matti Paasivuori 1911–1912, 1918–1920, 1926–1929
- Oskari Tokoi 1912–1917
- Johan Lumivuokko 1917–1918
- Matti Väisänen 1920–1923
- Edvard Huttunen 1923–1925
- Erkki Härmä 1926
- Iisakki Heikka 1929–1930
- Yrjö Murto 1930
