= Erkki Härmä =

Finnish trade union official and politician (1890–1957)

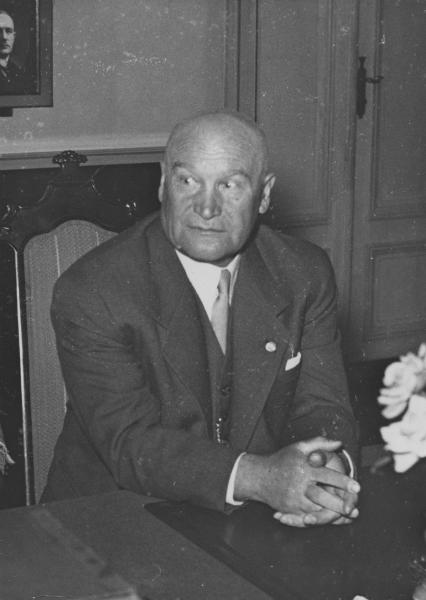
Erkki Härmä in 1949

Erik (Erkki) Herman Härmä (10 July 1890 – 10 November 1957) was a Finnish trade union official and politician, born in Turku. He was a member of the Parliament of Finland from 1917 until 1918 and again from 1948 to 1949, representing the Social Democratic Party of Finland (SDP). During the Finnish Civil War, he was a member of the Central Workers' Council of Finland, the legislature of the Finnish Socialist Workers' Republic. Because of this, he was imprisoned from 1918 to 1922. He was active in the Left Group of Finnish Workers while it existed, but after its suppression, he returned to the SDP. He served as a cabinet minister from 1946 to 1949.
