= 1925 Finnish presidential election =

← 1919	15–16 January 1925	1931 →
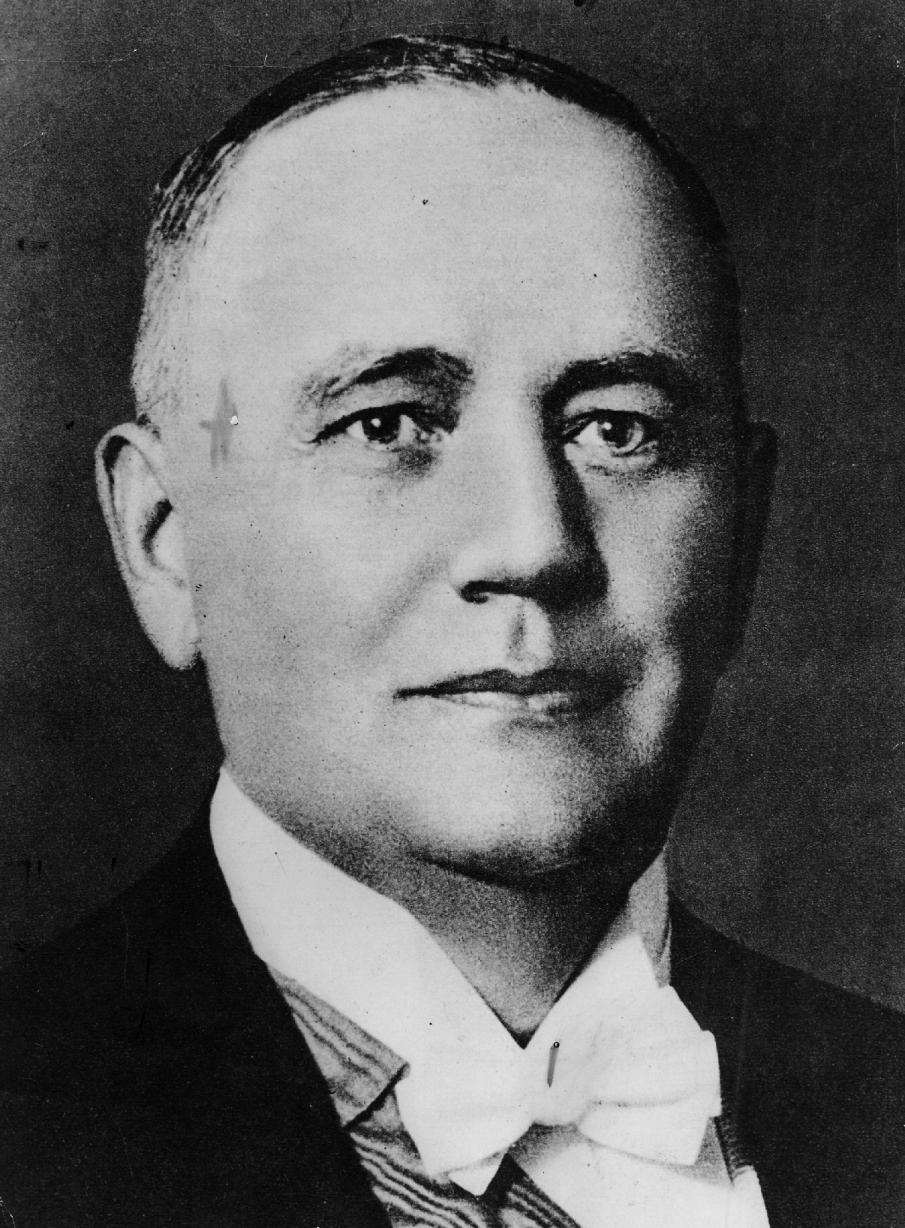

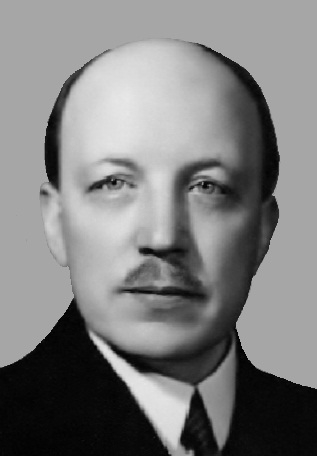
Candidate	Lauri Kristian Relander	Risto Ryti
Party	Agrarian	National Progressive
Electoral vote	172	109
Popular vote	123,932	71,199
President before election
Kaarlo Juho Ståhlberg
National Progressive
Elected President
Lauri Kristian Relander
Agrarian

Two-stage presidential elections were held in Finland in 1925. On 15 and 16 January the public elected presidential electors to an electoral college. They in turn elected the president. The result was a victory for Lauri Kristian Relander, who won on the third ballot. The turnout for the popular vote was just 40%.

The outgoing president, Kaarlo Juho Ståhlberg, had refused to seek a second term. According to Agrarian and Centrist politician, Johannes Virolainen, he stepped down after one term because he believed that an incumbent president would be too likely to win re-election. Ståhlberg claimed that he had already completed his political service to Finland as president. Moreover, he wanted to step down because many right-wing Finns (especially veterans of the Civil War and supporters of the Greater Finland movement) opposed him. According to historian Pentti Virrankoski, Ståhlberg hoped that his retirement would advance parliamentary politics in Finland. Ståhlberg's party, the Progressives, chose Risto Ryti, the governor of the Bank of Finland, as their presidential candidate. The Agrarians only chose Lauri Kristian Relander as their presidential candidate in early February 1925. The National Coalitioners originally chose former Regent and Prime Minister Pehr Evind Svinhufvud as their presidential candidate, but before the presidential electors met, they replaced Svinhufvud with Hugo Suolahti, an academician working as the rector of the University of Helsinki. Relander surprised many politicians by defeating Ryti as a dark-horse candidate, although he had served as the Speaker of Parliament and as Governor of the Province of Viipuri. Ståhlberg had quietly favoured Ryti as his successor because he considered Ryti a principled and unselfish politician. He was disappointed with Relander's victory and told one of his daughters that if he had known beforehand that Relander would be elected as his successor, he would have considered seeking a second term.

== Results ==
=== Popular vote ===
Party	Votes	%	Seats
Social Democratic Party	165,091	26.55	79
National Coalition Party	141,240	22.71	68
Agrarian League	123,932	19.93	69
Swedish People's Party	78,422	12.61	35
National Progressive Party	71,199	11.45	33
Socialist Workers' Party	41,213	6.63	16
Others	822	0.13	0
Total	621,919	100.00	300
Valid votes	621,919	99.64	
Invalid/blank votes	2,258	0.36	
Total votes	624,177	100.00	
Registered voters/turnout	1,572,485	39.69	
Source: Nohln & Stöver

=== Electoral college ===
Candidate	Party	First round		Second round		Third round	
Candidate	Party	Votes	%	Votes	%	Votes	%
Väinö Tanner	Social Democratic Party	78	26.00	2	0.67		
Lauri Kristian Relander	Agrarian League	69	23.00	97	32.44	172	61.21
Hugo Suolahti	National Coalition Party	68	22.67	80	26.76		
Risto Ryti	National Progressive Party	33	11.00	104	34.78	109	38.79
Karl Söderholm	Swedish People's Party	35	11.67				
Matti Väisänen	Socialist Workers' Party	16	5.33	16	5.35		
Väinö Voionmaa	Social Democratic Party	1	0.33				
Total		300	100.00	299	100.00	281	100.00
Valid votes		300	100.00	299	99.67	281	93.67
Invalid/blank votes		0	0.00	1	0.33	19	6.33
Total votes		300	100.00	300	100.00	300	100.00
Source: Nohlen & Stöver
