= Eldar Efendijev =

Estonian politician

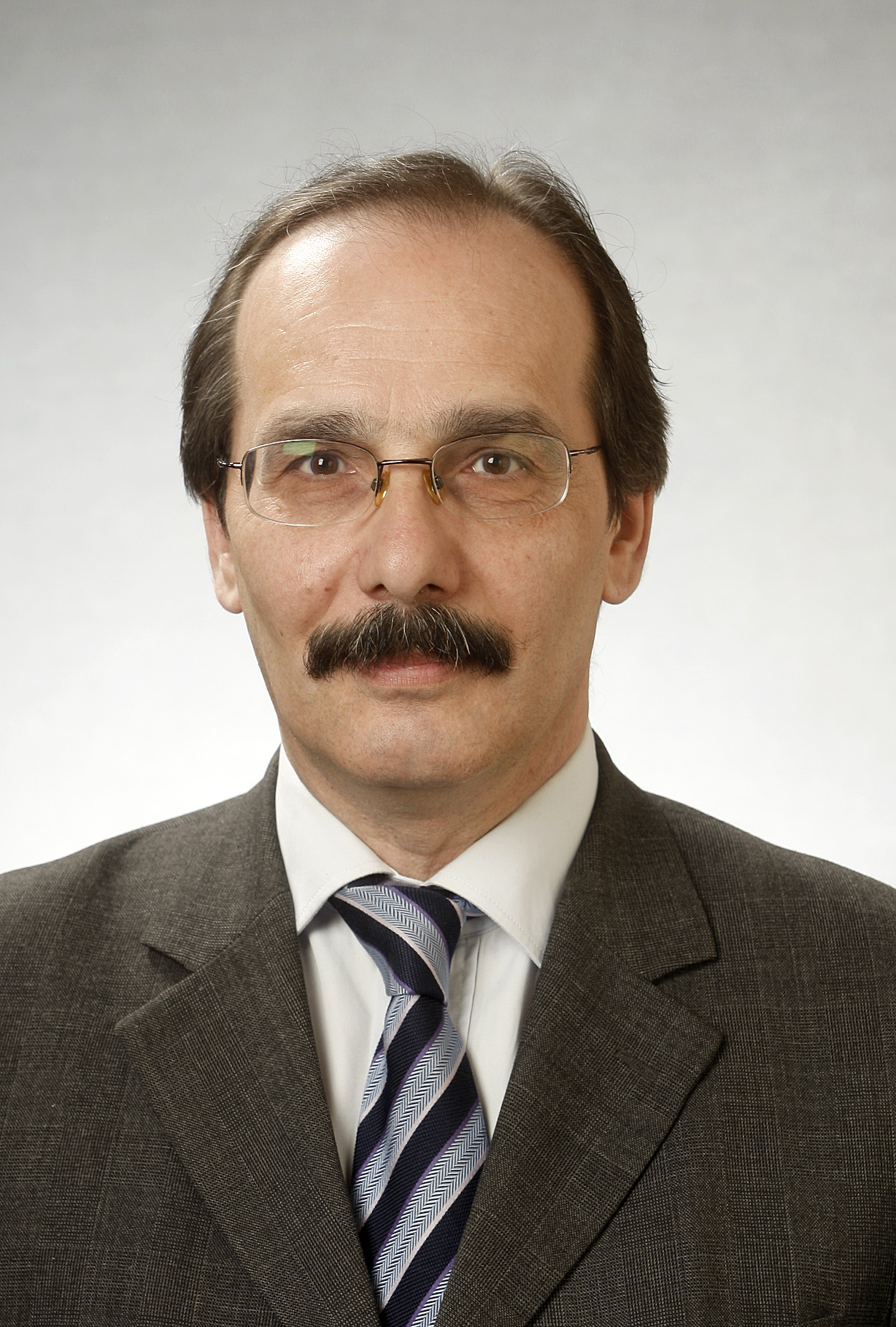
- Eldar Efendijev in 2011

Minister of Population and Ethnic Affairs
- In office 2002–2003
- Prime Minister: Siim Kallas
- Preceded by: Katrin Saks
- Succeeded by: Paul-Eerik Rummo

Mayor of Narva
- In office 1998–2000
- Preceded by: Raivo Murd
- Succeeded by: Imre Liiv

Personal details
- Born: 29 June 1954 (age 72) Tallinn, then part of Estonian SSR, Soviet Union
- Party: Estonian Centre Party
- Education: Herzen University

Eldar Efendijev (Azerbaijani: Eldar Əfəndiyev; born 29 June 1954, Tallinn) is an Estonian politician of Azeri descent who was the minister of Population and Ethnic Affairs from 2002 to 2003 and who represented the Estonian Centre Party in the Riigikogu from 2007 to 2015.

== Education ==
Efendijev graduated from Narva 6th Secondary School in 1971 and earned a degree in history from Herzen University in 1976.

== Career ==
Efendijev worked as a researcher at the Baltijets factory from 1971 to 1972, and as a researcher at the Narva Museum from 1976 to 1978, as well as head of the branch from 1978 to 1979, and the director of the museum from 1979 to 1999 and from 2001 to 2002.

== Political career ==
Efendijev has been a member of the Estonian Centre Party since 1997. He was a member of the Narva City Council from 1996 to 1999 and again from 2001 to 2002, as well as being the mayor of Narva from 1998 to 2000. Efendijev was a member of the Riigikogu from 2007 to 2015.

He was the minister of Population and Ethnic Affairs under prime minister Siim Kallas from 2002 to 2003.

== Awards ==
- 2006: 4th class of the Order of the National Coat of Arms (received 23 February 2006)
- 2011: Dostlug Order of Azerbaijan
