= Aleksi Aaltonen =

Finnish journalist and politician (1892–1956)

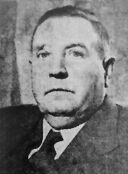
Aleksi Aaltonen

Aleksius (Aleksi) Aaltonen (5 July 1892 – 22 February 1956) was a Finnish journalist and politician, born in Somero. He was a member of the Parliament of Finland from 1929 to 1936, representing the Social Democratic Party of Finland (SDP). He served as Minister of Social Affairs twice from 17 December 1943 to 21 September 1944 and from 18 March 1949 to 17 March 1950, as Deputy Minister of Finance from 30 July 1948 to 18 March 1949, and as Minister at Council of State from 29 July 1948 to 18 March 1949. Aaltonen was the Director General of Kela from 1945 to 1954. He was a presidential elector in the 1931 Finnish presidential election.
