= Unto Varjonen =

Finnish politician

Unto Uuno Mikael Varjonen (22 August 1916, Turku – 11 February 1954 Washington D.C. United States) was a Finnish politician who belonged to the right wing of the Social Democratic Party of Finland (SDP). He served as Minister without portfolio from 29 July to 19 August 1949 and as Deputy Minister of Finance from 19 August 1949 to 17 March 1950. He was a Member of the Parliament of Finland from 1948 to 1951.
