= Andra Veidemann =

Estonian politician

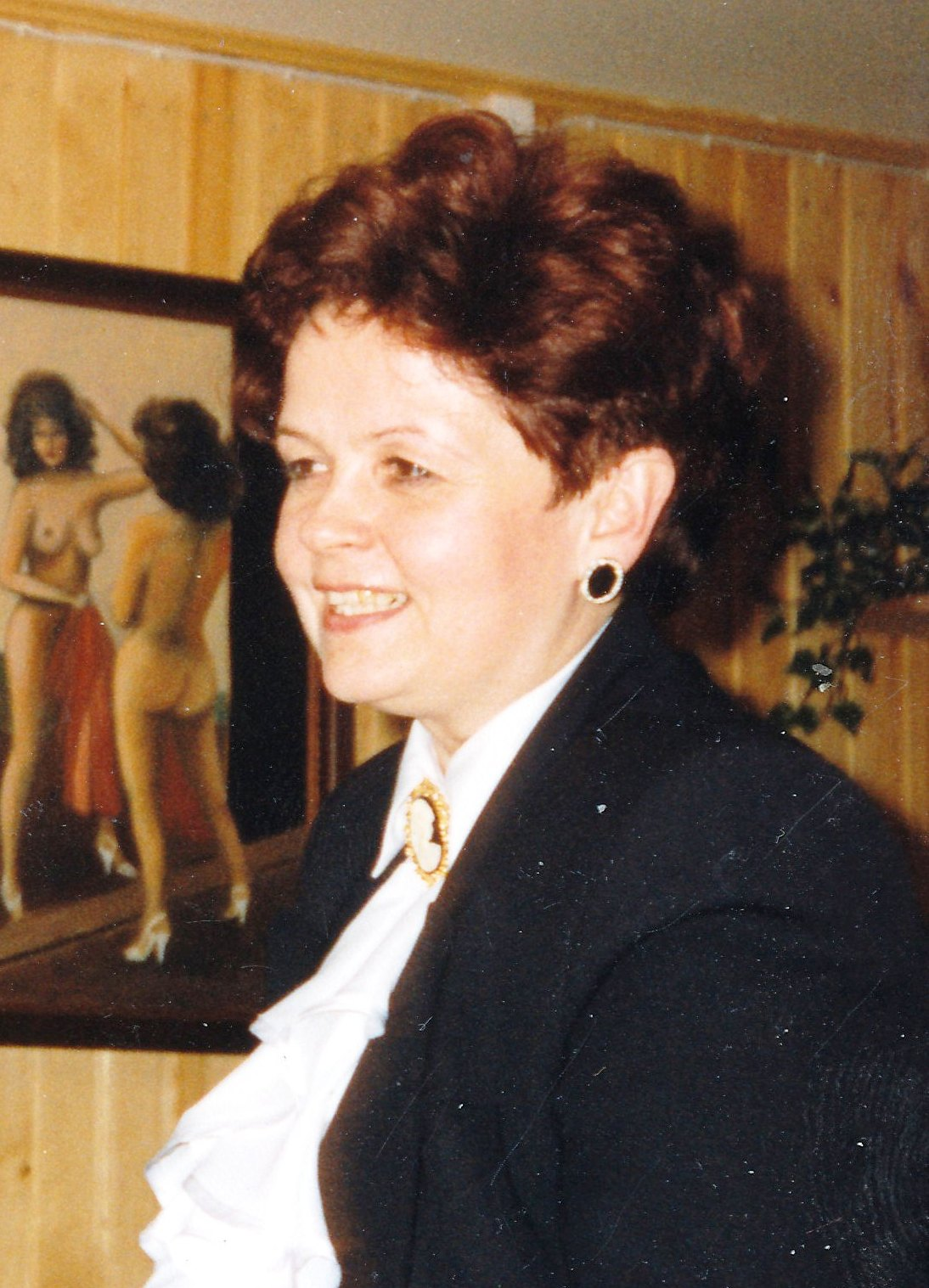
Andra Veidemann

Andra Veidemann (née Andra Eesmaa; born 18 July 1955 Tallinn) is an Estonian historian-ethnologist, editor, diplomat, and politician. She was a member of VII Riigikogu. From 1999 until 2001, she was the editor-in-chief of AS Kirjastus Ilo publishing house. From 2006 until 2008, she was the Cultural Attaché at the Embassy of the Republic of Estonia in Moscow and Russia.
