= Iris aurea =

Iris aurea can refer to the following plant species:

- Iris aurea Lindl., a synonym of Iris crocea Jacquem. ex R.C.Foster
- Iris aurea Link, a synonym of Iris halophila Pall. var. halophila
