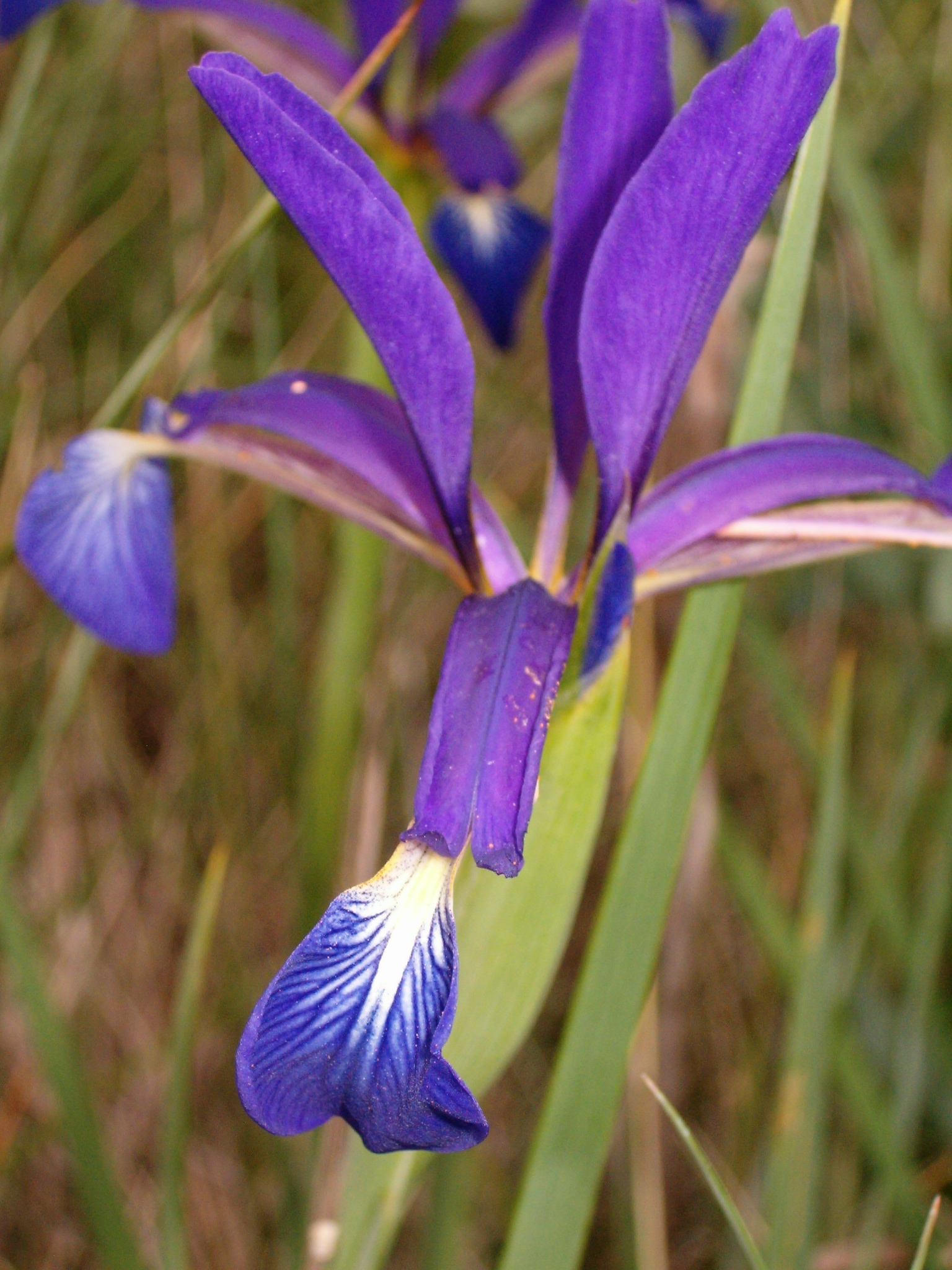

Scientific classification
- Kingdom: Plantae
- Clade: Tracheophytes
- Clade: Angiosperms
- Clade: Monocots
- Order: Asparagales
- Family: Iridaceae
- Genus: Iris
- Species: I. spuria
- Subspecies: I. s. subsp. maritima

Trinomial name
- Iris spuria subsp. maritima (Dykes) P.Fourn.

Synonyms
- Chamaeiris reichenbachiana var. hispanica (Bernátsky) M.B.Crespo; Iris maritima Lam. (nom. illeg.); Iris spathulata f. hispanica Bernátsky; Iris spuria var. hispanica Dykes; Iris spuria var. maritima Dykes; Xyridion maritimum (Dykes) Rodion.

= Iris spuria subsp. maritima =

Subspecies of flowering plant

Iris spuria subsp. maritima is a species of the genus Iris, part of a subgenus series known as Iris subg. Limniris and in the series Iris ser. Spuriae. It is a subspecies of Iris spuria, a beardless, rhizomatous perennial plant, from coastal regions Europe and north Africa with deep blue-violet flowers.

It is cultivated as an ornamental plant in temperate regions.

== Description ==
It has a rhizome, which is undescribed.

It has basal leaves, that can be described as evergreen (staying on the plant even during very cold winters). They are between 6 mm to 2 cm wide. They can grow as tall as the flowering stem at blooming time, but they then can grow taller after blooming period is over.

It has a stem that grows between 20–70 cm (8–28 in) tall.

The stem has several green, narrow and tapering spathes (leaves of the flower bud). They entirely cover the stem. The leaves are generally up to 8 cm long, and longer than the internodes.

The stems hold 2–4 terminal (top of stem) flowers, between Spring and Summer, or between April and July.

It has scented, flowers that come in shades of blue-violet, purple, violet, or deep blue.

It has 2 pairs of petals, 3 large sepals (outer petals), known as the 'falls' and 3 inner, smaller petals (or tepals, known as the 'standards'. The falls have a deflexed, rounded blade, 3–8 cm (1–3 in) long, with a yellow, cream or white centre that is heavily veined with purple or blue-violet. Behind the blade, it has a longer law (part of the petal closest to the stem) with a greenish stripe.

Unlike other spuria plants from Slovakia, the flowers have conspicuous distinctive veining on the blade, the enlarged end portions of the falls. The standards are erect, lanceolate, narrowly obovate and 3–6 cm (1–2 in) long.

It has a violet stigmata, that has 2 acute and erect lobes, and it also has an ovary with narrow peak.

=== Biochemistry ===
As most irises are diploid, having two sets of chromosomes, this can be used to identify hybrids and classification of groupings. It has a chromosome count: 2n=38.

== Taxonomy ==
It is written as 海岸アイリスin Japanese script.

The Latin specific epithet maritima refers to "maritimus" meaning that grows at the edge of the sea.

It has many common names such as; seashore Iris, maritime Iris, or marine Iris.

It is known in Catalan as coltell mari.

It was originally published as Iris maritima by Jean-Baptiste Lamarck in Flore Françoise, ou Descriptions Succinctes de Toutes les Plantes qui Croissent Naturellement en France in Paris (Fl. Franç.) Vol 3. page497 in 1779.

It was also published in Curtis's Botanical Magazine Volumes 27–28 in 1808. Then in Tabl. Encycl. Vol.3 on page 497 in 1823, also by Lamarck.

This was later declared as an illegal (or illegitimate) name due to a clash with Iris maritima Mill. (originally published in Gard. Dict. edition 8 page 11, in 1768). Although, this was later declared a synonym of Iris sibirica L.

Specimens were collected by Huet and Jacquin in 1861. Then grown by William Rickatson Dykes in 1911. Dykes then worked out some of the relationships of the Spuria Irises series, published in his book The Iris in 1913.

It was then published as Iris spuria subsp. maritima by Paul Victor Fournier, in Quatre Fl. in France Vol.190 in 1935.

It was verified by United States Department of Agriculture Agricultural Research Service on 9 January 2003, and updated on 3 December 2004.

== Distribution and habitat ==
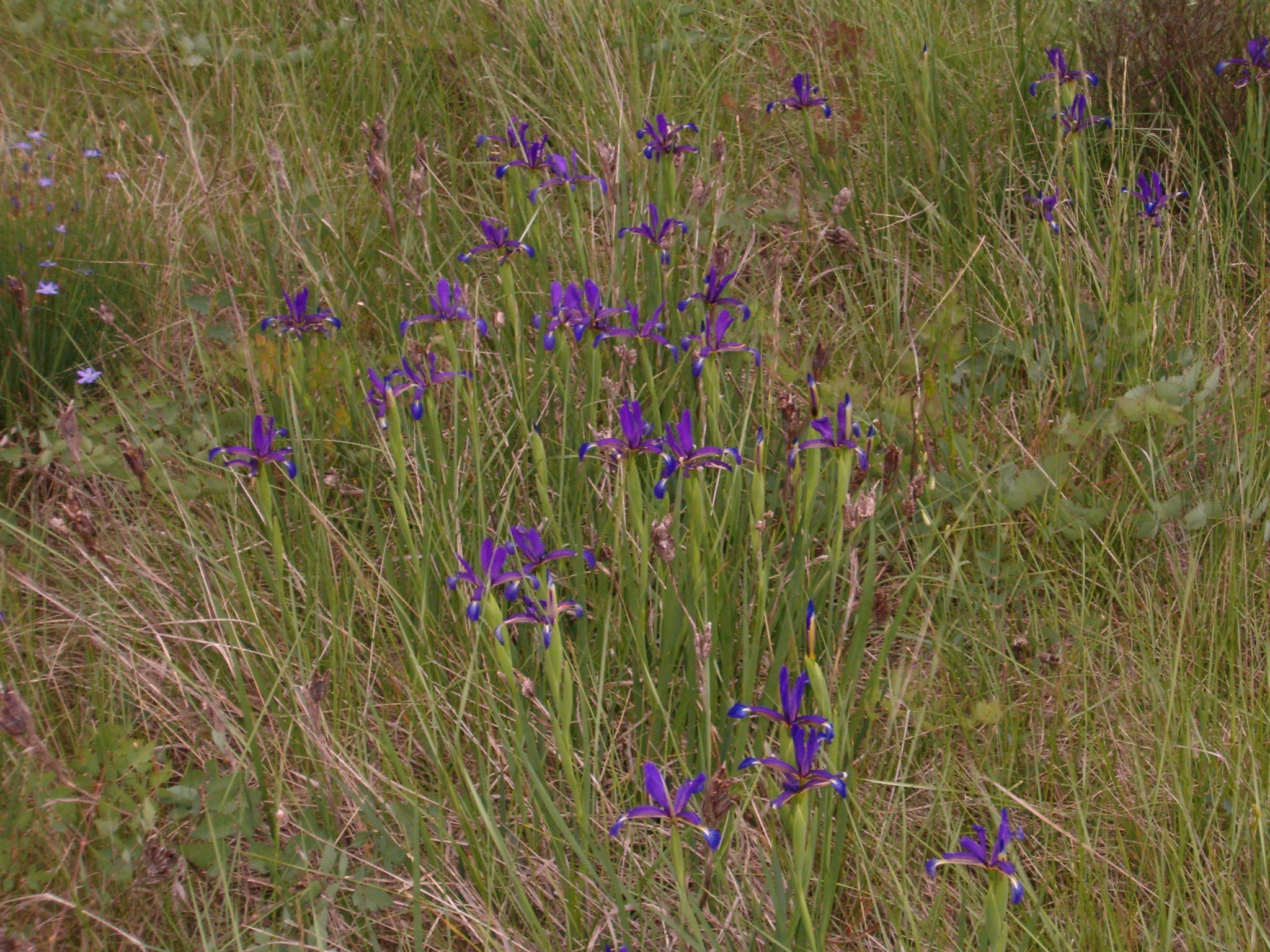
Iris spuria subsp. maritima growing in France

It is native to temperate regions of North Africa and Europe.

=== Range ===
It is found within Africa, in Algeria. It is found within Europe, in France, and Spain.

It is found along the coasts of Mediterranean and Atlantic Ocean,(of southern Europe and Iberian Peninsula).

It may also be found in Corsica, and in the Balkans.

It has specifically found in several Departments of France including, Charente-Maritime, (near Ciré-d'Aunis and Rochefort) Hérault, Vendée, (near Saint-Denis-du-Payré,) Pyrénées-Orientales (near Argelès-sur-Mer,) and Var, (near Hyères.)

Also within Spain, near Madrid, Aragon and Navarra.

=== Habitat ===
It is found growing in wet meadows, and marshes, near the sea.

At altitudes of up to 300m above sea level.

== Conservation ==
It is a rare or endangered plant species, similar to Adder's-tongue Spearwort.

It is grown in various protected places in Europe.

Within Bardenas Reales (in Spain), the iris grows alongside an orchid (Ophrys scolopax).

Although in 2014, it has been lost from the Var department.

== Cultivation ==
It is hardy to USDA zones 4–9, or (Europe) Zone 7 (−17.7 to −12.3 °C). Also can survive temperatures as low as −34 °C.

It can be grown in most garden soils, including clay soils. Although it prefers not excessively poor nutrient soils. It can tolerate pH levels of between Neutral and Acid.

It prefers positions in full sun.

It has low to medium water requirements.

It can be used within the garden in a mixed-border, in a gravel garden, used as a cut flower. It can be used as a ground cover plant in some places, or in landscaping projects.

Specimens can be found in various herbariums, including; Kew Gardens, Vienna Hofmuseum, University of Cambridge, British Museum (in the Natural History Department of South Kensington, London) and the herbarium of the Botanical Garden of Berlin.

=== Hybrids and cultivars ===
Known cultivars include Belise (Simonett 1964) – which is 36" tall, blue-lavender self from a cross of two species, Iris spuria subsp. maritima crossed with Iris spuria subsp. carthaliniae.

== Sources ==
- Mathew, B. 1981. The Iris. 118.
- Tutin, T. G. et al., eds. 1964–1980. Flora europaea.
