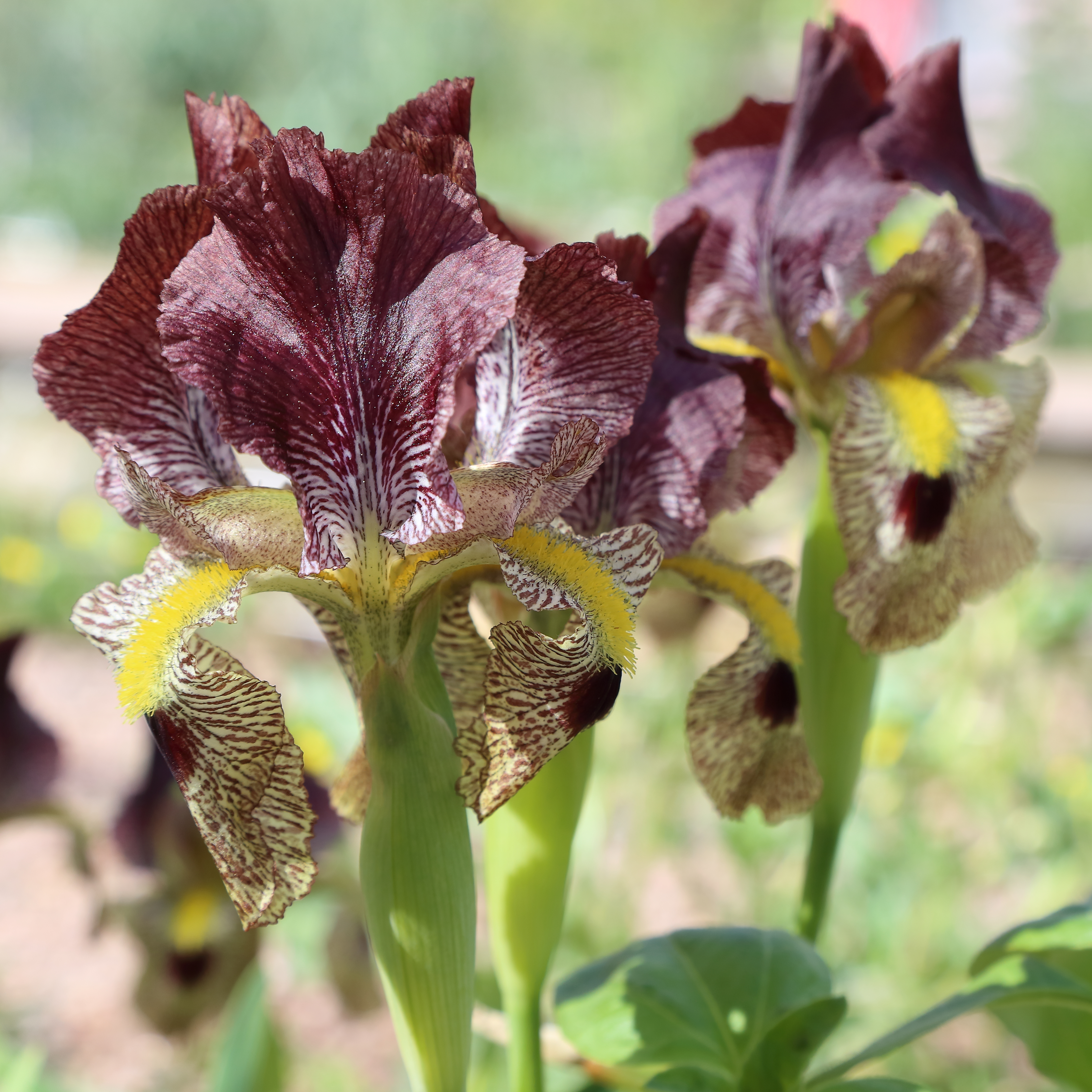

Scientific classification
- Kingdom: Plantae
- Clade: Tracheophytes
- Clade: Angiosperms
- Clade: Monocots
- Order: Asparagales
- Family: Iridaceae
- Genus: Iris
- Subgenus: Iris subg. Iris
- Section: Iris sect. Oncocyclus
- Species: I. paradoxa

Binomial name
- Iris paradoxa Steven

Synonyms
- Iris annae Grossh.; Iris paradoxa f. paradoxa; Iris paradoxa var. violacea Baker; Oncocyclus paradoxus (Steven) Siemssen

= Iris paradoxa =

Species of plant

Iris paradoxa is a species of flowering plant native to western Asia. It has large upright petals and smaller lower petals, which is unique amongst most iris forms. They come in various shades from white, lavender, mauve, medium purple, violet, dark purple to black. It has a black or purplish black beard on the lower petals. It comes from the region of Transcaucasia, and is found in the countries of Iran, Turkey, Armenia and in Azerbaijan.

== Description ==
I. paradoxa is a rhizomatous herbaceous perennial. The rhizomes are slender and usually less than 1 cm in diameter. It also has secondary roots underneath the rhizomes.

It has greenish-gray, or blue-green leaves, that are recurved or falcate (sickle-like) shaped. They are narrow, between 2–4 mm (0–0 in) wide, and less than 4 cm long.

The upright stem grows between 10–25 cm (4–10 in) long, and hold up to 2 blooms.

It blooms in spring, or early summer, between April and June. The flowers are 10 cm in diameter, and come in various shades from white, lavender, mauve, medium purple, violet, dark purple to black.

Like other irises, the flowers have 2 pairs of petals, 3 large sepals (outer petals), known as the 'falls' and 3 inner, smaller petals (or tepals, known as the 'standards'. Compared to other irises, the paradoxa or strangeness of the iris, is that in most forms of irises, the standards are smaller than the falls, but on I. paradoxa the falls are much smaller than the standards.

The erect standards are broadly obovate, or rounded, and 5–9 cm (2–4 in) long and 3–3.6 cm (1–1 in) wide. They are a pale shade with pale blue or deep blue veining. The smaller falls are a darker colour, blackish-violet, through to pale purple densely overlaid with black-purple veins. They are 2.5–4 cm (1–2 in) long and 1–1.5 cm (0–1 in) wide.

The falls are also covered with blackish, blackish-purple or violet hairs or 'beard' with a pale v-shaped mark in centre.

After flowering, it becomes dormant in late summer.

The seed capsule produced after flower has not been described.

=== Biochemistry ===
As most irises are diploid, meaning having two sets of chromosomes. This can be used to identify hybrids and classification of groupings. Iris paradoxa has been counted as 2n=20 .

== Taxonomy ==
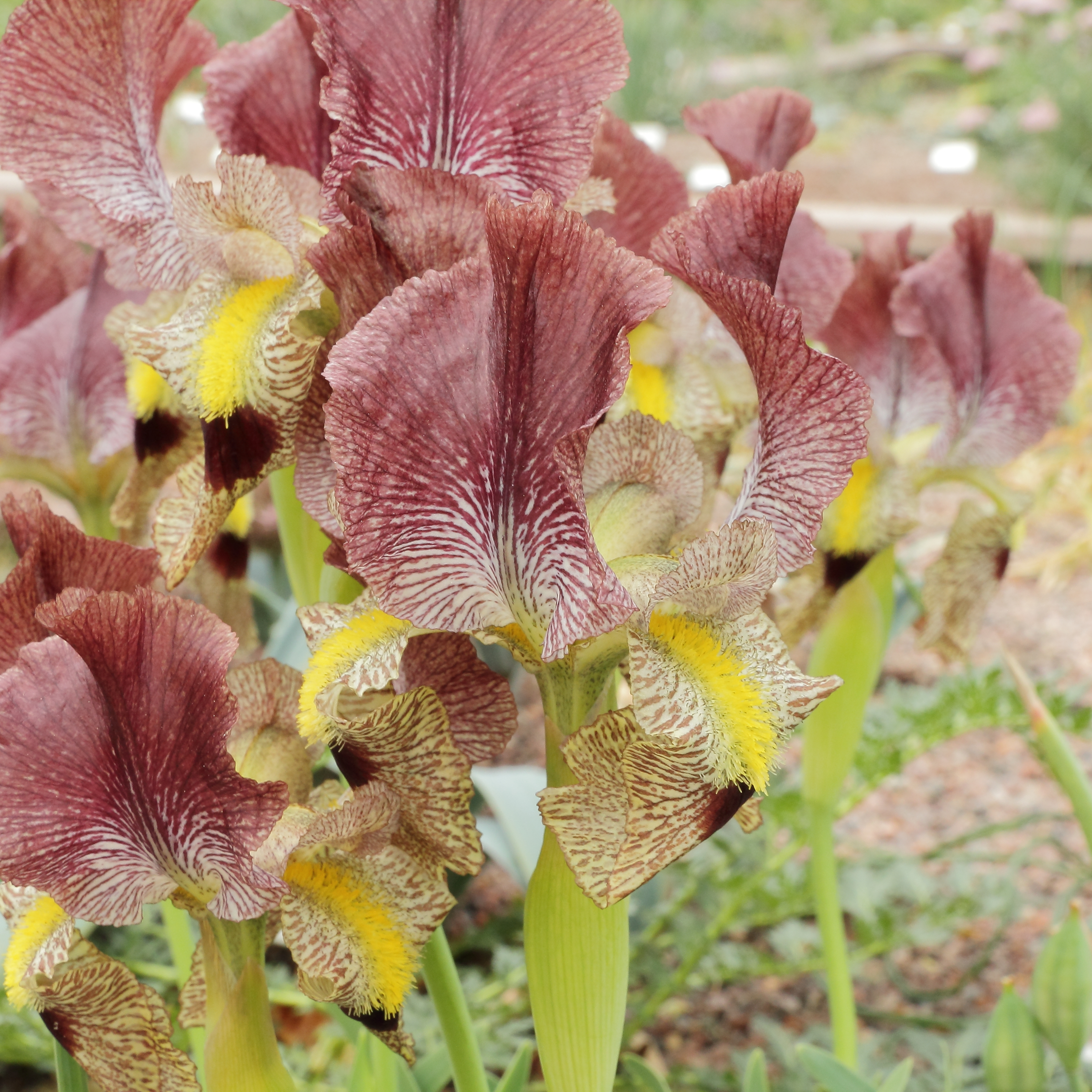
Iris paradoxa from Gothenburg Botanical Garden, Sweden

Iris paradoxa is classified in the subgenus Iris sub. Iris, Iris sect. Oncocyclus. There is a known form from Turkey called I. paradoxa f. choschab. The Latin specific epithet paradoxa refers to the Greek word for 'unusual', This is due to being thought being entirely unlike any other species.

It was discovered in the Caucus region, and then was first published and described by Steven in 'Mémoires de la Société Impériale des Naturalistes de Moscou' (Mém. Soc. Imp. Naturalistes Moscou) Vol.5 on page 355 in 1817.

It is occasionally called the 'Unusual iris', or 'Velvet Iris' in America.

=== Forms ===
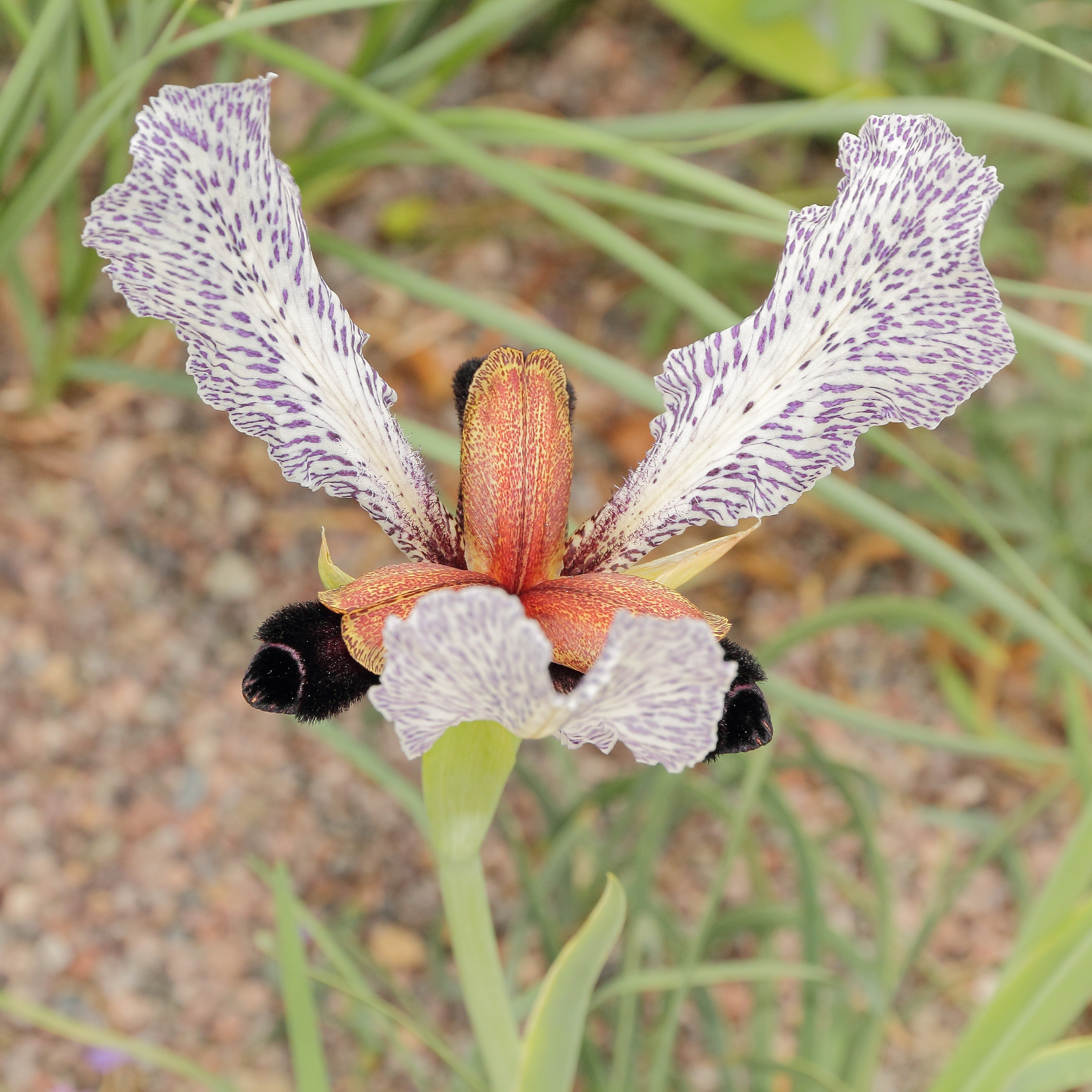
Iris paradoxa f. choschab from Gothenburg Botanical Garden, Sweden

There is a known form called I. paradoxa f. choschab (Hoog) B.Mathew & Wendelbo. It was published in Fl. Iran. Vol.112 on page 31 in 1975.

Originally Iris paradoxa f. choschab was thought by Johannes Marius Cornelis Hoog to be a variety of I. paradoxa, called I. paradoxa var. choschab and then published in Gard. Chron. III, 29: 104 in 1901, before being downgraded to a form in 1975.

It can be found near Lake Van, close to the town of Başkale, and it is common around the village of Hoşap, known for its Hoşap Castle, Gürpınar District, Van Province, Eastern Anatolia, Turkey. 'Choschab' was an old version of the Aramaic name of the castle, meaning 'good water' or 'beautiful water'. The village of Hoşap is now known by the Turkish name of 'Güzelsu'.

The form is thought to be most used in cultivation. It has white standards, or pale lilac, lightly veined with blue. The beard is black and covers the upper half of the falls and the style arms are cream, speckled reddish brown.

The internal tepals ("petals") are lined with purple on a white (choschab form) or purple to mauve (paradoxa form) background.

== Ecology ==
Males of Xylocopa valga (a type of carpenter bee) have been observed pseudo-copulating on the reduced, velvety petals of the plant in Leriksky area, near Gosmaljan, Azerbaijan.

== Distribution and habitat ==
It is native to temperate Western Asia. It is found in the region of Transcaucasia, and in the countries of Iran, (formerly Persia), Turkey, Armenia and in Azerbaijan, (including in the Nakhchivan region).

It grows on arid, stony hillsides and they can be found at altitude between 1,200–2,000 metres (3,900–6,600 ft) above sea level.

== Cultivation ==
I. paradoxa can be easily grown in an alpine house, or they can be placed in rock gardens, which should have a summer drought. They grow well in full sun with mildly acidic to mildly alkaline soils (of ph levels between 6.1–7.8). The flower and stem (if removed from the plant) may have a shelf life of two to three days. Irises can generally be propagated by division, or by seed growing.

I. paradoxa has been listed with Iris orientalis and Iris spuria subsp. musulmanica as halophyte (salt-tolerant) plants.

== Cultivars and crosses ==
Iris paradoxa has been used in various breeding programmes and various cultivars have been produced including: 'Atrata', 'Choschab', 'Jolfa Form', 'Medwedewi', 'Mirabilis', 'Paradoxa' and 'Paradoxa Albo-Lutescens'.

Various Iris paradoxa crossed Hybrids have also been produced;

- Iris paradoxa X Iris pallida : 'Alkmene', 'Hamadan', 'Lady Lilford' and 'Parpall'
- Iris paradoxa X Iris variegata : 'Parvar' and 'Shadrach'

Iris paradoxa crossed with Section Oncocyclus Irises:

- Iris paradoxa and Iris acutiloba : 'Zuvendicus'
- Iris camillae X Iris paradoxa: 'First Sergeant'
- Iris iberica X Iris paradoxa: 'Ib-Parad', 'Koenigii' and 'Paradib'

Iris paradoxa crossed with Section Regelia Irises :

- Iris paradoxa X Iris korolkowii : 'Parkor', 'Camilla', 'Clytemnestra', 'Sirona' and 'Minerva',
- ¼ Iris paradoxa crosses 'Cactiforium', 'Charming Chick', 'Clotho', 'Dear Me', 'Don Ricardo', 'Emily Pyke' and 'Regal Plus'

== Toxicity ==
Like many other irises, most parts of the plant are poisonous (including rhizome and leaves), if mistakenly ingested, it can cause stomach pains and vomiting. Also handling the plant may cause a skin irritation or an allergic reaction.
