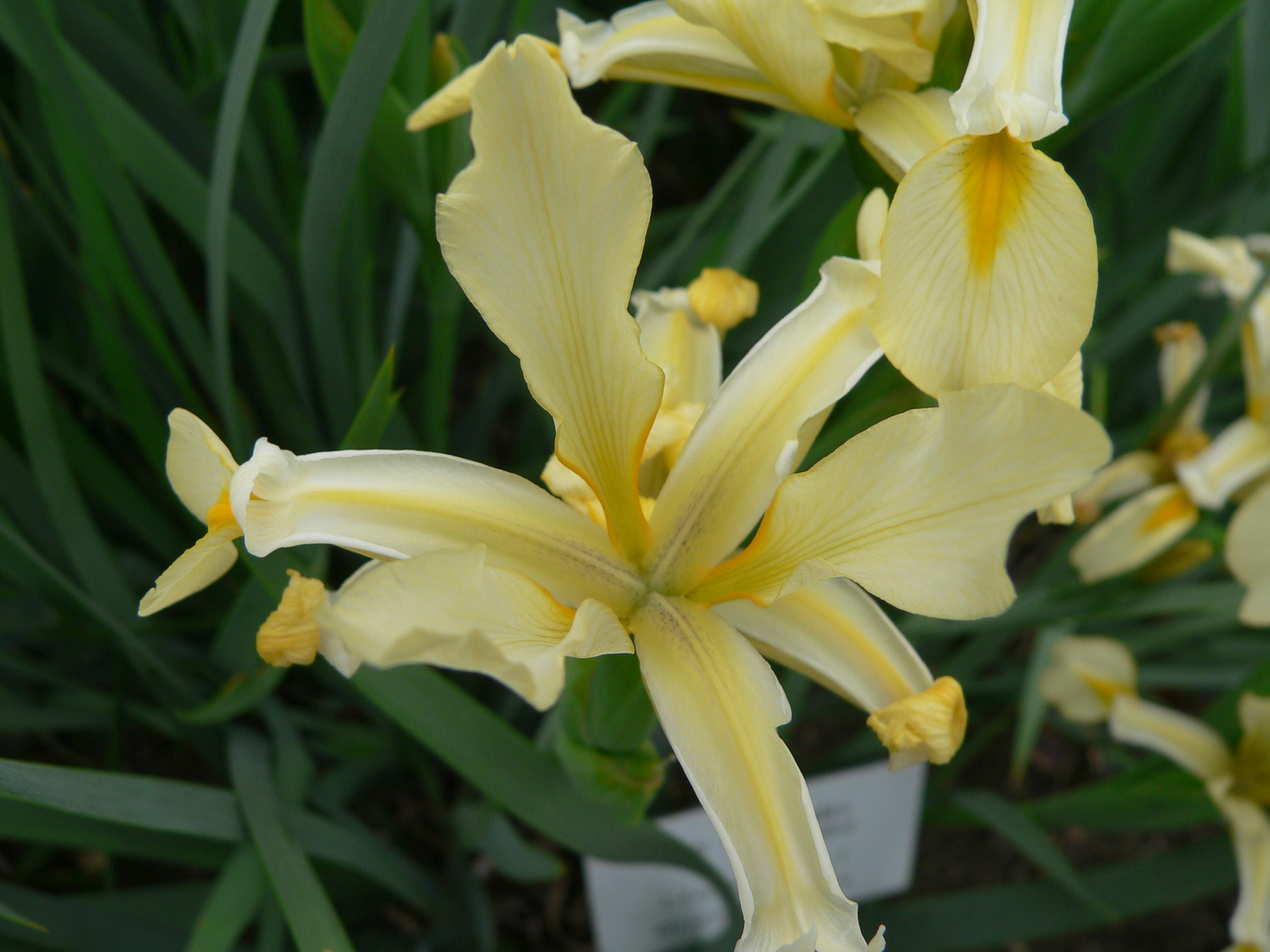

Scientific classification
- Kingdom: Plantae
- Clade: Embryophytes
- Clade: Tracheophytes
- Clade: Spermatophytes
- Clade: Angiosperms
- Clade: Monocots
- Order: Asparagales
- Family: Iridaceae
- Genus: Iris
- Subgenus: Iris subg. Limniris
- Section: Iris sect. Limniris
- Series: Iris ser. Spuriae
- Species: I. orientalis

Binomial name
- Iris orientalis Mill.

Synonyms
- Chamaeiris longipedicellata (Czeczott) M.B.Crespo; Chamaeiris monnieri (DC.) M.B.Crespo; Chamaeiris orientalis (Mill.) M.B.Crespo; Iris albida Davidov; Iris gigantea Carrière; Iris longipedicellata Czeczott; Iris monnieri DC.; Iris ochroleuca L.; Iris spuria subsp. monnieri (DC.) Dykes; Iris spuria var. ochroleuca (L.) Sims; Iris spuria subsp. ochroleuca (L.) Dykes; Xiphion monnieri (DC.) Alef.; Xiphion ochroleucum (L.) Alef. [Illegitimate]; Xyridion monnieri (DC.) Klatt; Xyridion ochroleucum (L.) Klatt; Xyridion orientalis (Mill.) Rodion.

= Iris orientalis =

Species of flowering plant

Iris orientalis is a species in the genus Iris; it is also in the subgenus Limniris and in the series Spuriae. It is a rhizomatous perennial plant, from Turkey and Greece, with white flowers with a yellow mark or blotch. It was also known as Iris ochroleuca for a long time. It is commonly known as yellow banded iris in the U.S. and Turkish iris in the UK but also has some other less common names. It is very hardy and has been known to naturalize in various countries. It is widely cultivated as an ornamental plant in temperate regions.

== Description ==
It has short, branching, stout, woody rhizomes. They can be up to 1.5 cm in diameter. Underneath, they have fleshy roots.

Over a long period, they can form large clumps of plants.

It has basal leaves, that are erect, between deep green and dark green, stiff and (lanceolate) sword-like. They can grow up to 60–90 cm (24–35 in) long and 1–2 cm wide. The leaves are not usually as long as the flowering stems.

The flower stalk begins to grow in April and then reaches maturity in May.

The solid, slightly flattened stems, about 1 cm wide, can generally grow up to between 40–90 cm (16–35 in) long.

Although, larger forms are known to be much bigger, growing up to between 90–170 cm (35–67 in) long. It has normally one or more short branches.

The stems have two or three spathes (leaves of the flower bud), which are papery (in form) and 9–12 cm (4–5 in) long.

The stems (and branches) hold two to five terminal (top of stem) flowers, which open in succession, blooming in late spring, or summer, between May and July.

The large flowers are 8–10 cm (3–4 in) in diameter, and are white or near white.

It has two pairs of petals, three large sepals (outer petals), known as the 'falls' and three inner, smaller petals (or tepals, known as the 'standards'. The falls are spreading, arching downwards, with a large egg-yolk yellow central area. They are 8–10 cm (3–4 in) long and 3–6 cm wide. The standards are erect, spatulate (spoon-like), with a yellow centre section surrounded in white. They are 4–8 cm (2–3 in) long and 1–1.5 cm wide.

The flowers are pollinated by insects.

It has 1–2.5 cm long, white, funnel-form or cup shaped perianth tube, 4–6 cm (2–2 in) long, white style branches, and 2 lobed stigmas.

After the iris has flowered, it produces an ovoid to oblong-elliptic, triangular in cross section, seed capsule, 4–6 cm (2–2 in) long and 2–2.5 cm wide, with a beaked top. The brown seed capsule has two ribs.

Inside the seed capsule, are 2 rows of papery, wrinkled, white, flattened or wedged-shaped seeds, that are 4–5 mm across.

=== Biochemistry ===
As most irises are diploid, having two sets of chromosomes. This can be used to identify hybrids and classification of groupings. It has been counted several times, 2n=39–40, Simonet in 1932 and 2n-40 by Lenz in 1963. It has been listed as 2n=39, or 2n=40.

In 2012, five Iris species (Iris pseudacorus, Iris crocea, Iris spuria, Iris orientalis and Iris ensata) were studied, to measure the flavonoids and phenolics content with the rhizomes. Iris pseudacorus had the highest content and Iris crocea had the lowest content.

In 2014, eight Irises from the Limniris section (Iris crocea, Iris ensata, Iris orientalis, Iris pseudacorus, Iris setosa, Iris sibirica with its cultivars 'Supernatural' and 'Whiskey White', Iris spuria and Iris versicolor) were studied to find 12 chemical compounds (flavonoids, phenols, quinones, tannins, saponins, cardiac glycosides, terpenoids, alkaloids, steroids, glycosides and proteins.

== Taxonomy ==
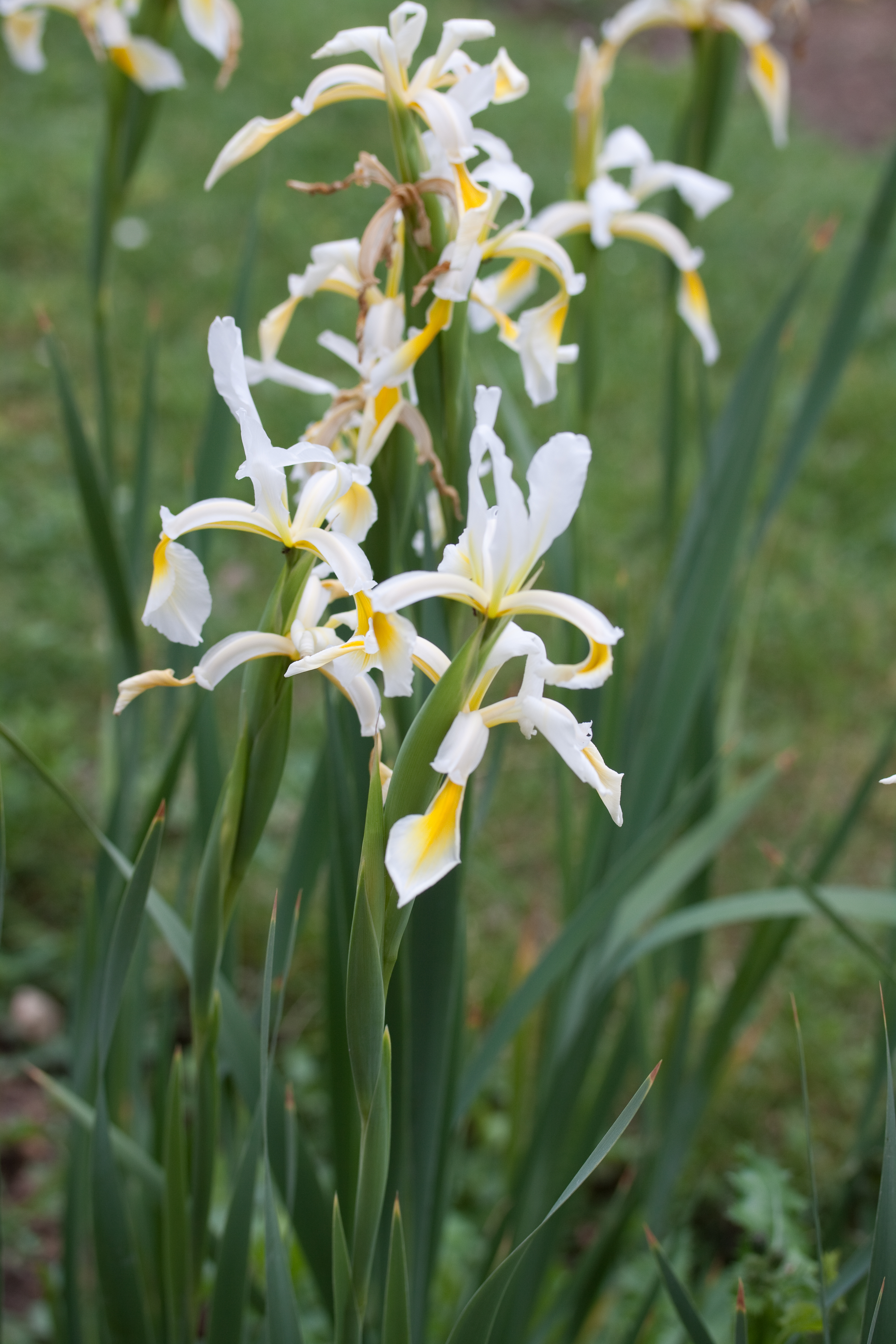
Irises growing in Jardin des Plantes in Paris

Iris orientalis is pronounced as 'EYE-ris (Iris) or-ee-en-TAY-liss (Orientalis).

It has several common names including; yellow band iris (in America), oriental iris, Turkish Iris in the UK, eastern iris, and Russian beauty iris.

It is also known as gullbandsiris in Sweden.

It was first published and described by Philip Miller in The Gardeners Dictionary, ed.8. no9. on the 16 April 1768.

In 1788, Curtis's Botanical Magazine, table 61, described Iris orientalis using the name Iris ochroleuca. This was the start of the confusion between the two irises. Because Iris ochroleuce was published later (by Carl Linnaeus in 1771), it is deemed unacceptable under the International Rules of Nomenclature. Later, Iris ochroleuca was classified as a synonym of Iris orientalis.

An illustration of Iris orientalis was in Botanical Magazine 61 in 1793.

It has been mistakenly thought to be a Japanese Iris, due to the name 'orientalis'.

The Latin specific epithet orientalis refers to 'eastern' but sometimes is also translated as 'from the Orient'.

It was verified by United States Department of Agriculture Agricultural Research Service on 4 April 2003.

Iris orientalis is an accepted name by the RHS.

== Distribution and habitat ==
Iris orientalis is native to Asia Minor.

=== Range ===
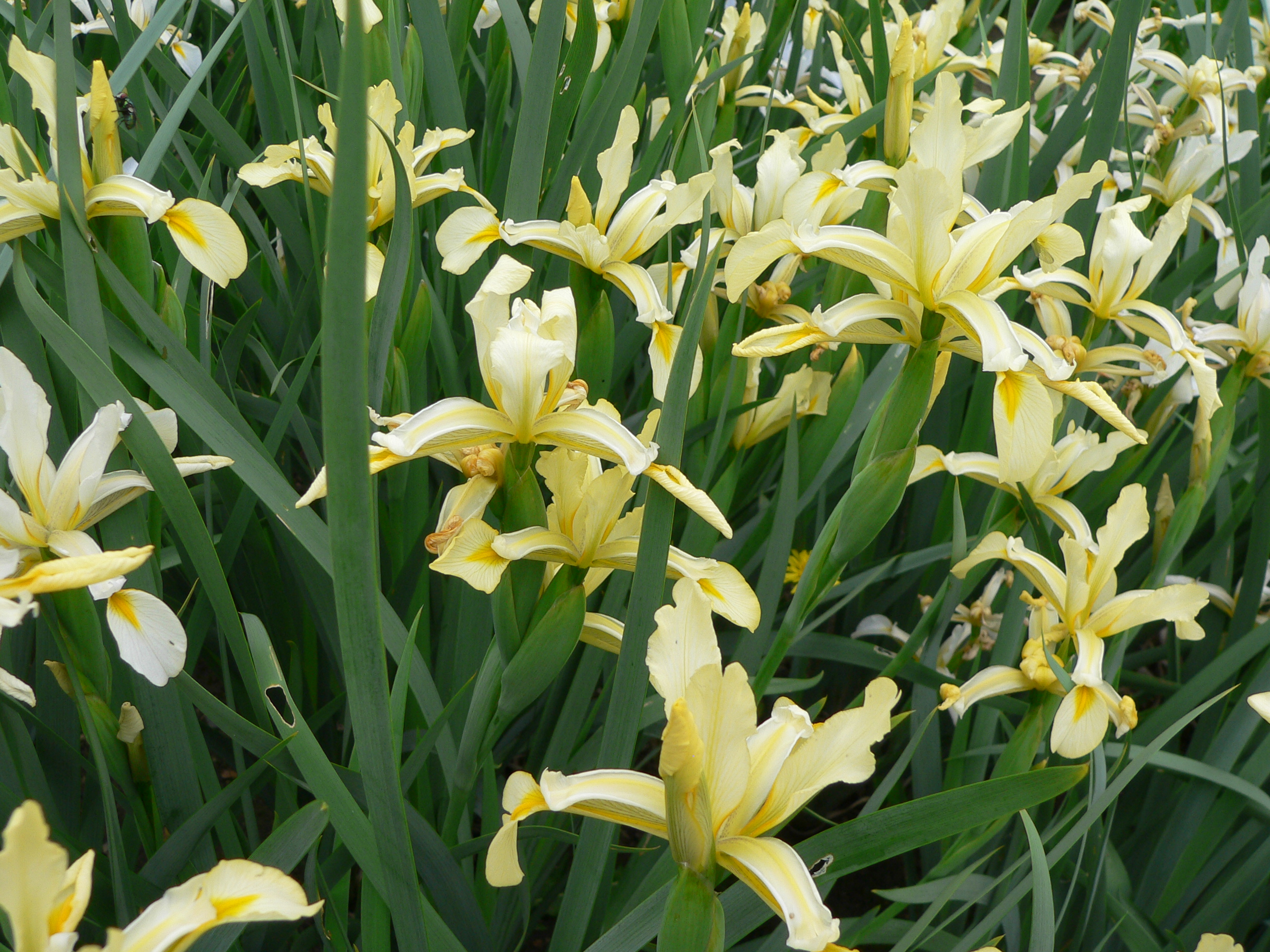

It is found in Turkey, and within south-eastern Europe, in Greece, and Aegean Islands, (Lesbos and Samos).

It is found in Greece near Alexandropoulos and within Turkey, east to Kayseri. It was once found by Pierre Edmond Boissier in the marshes to the west of Smyrna, in Greece.

One reference mentions Syria, but this may mean a cultivated region not native.

It has been naturalized in California, Connecticut, Missouri (in the US), along roadsides, and in old farms in Southern Italy, and in Yugoslavia. It has also naturalized in the UK, found on the edges of woodlands and in grasslands of the New Forest and around Abbotsbury in Dorset. The rivers of the Balkans are known for a diverse range of plants including Iris orientalis in Evros River delta.

=== Habitat ===
Iris orientalis grows on saline marshy lands, including damp meadows, and ditches, or irrigation channels.

It grows at altitudes of between 150 and 1400 metres above sea level.

== Cultivation ==
Iris orientalis is widely grown in gardens and parks. It is hardy to between USDA Zone 4a and 9b. Between (−34.4 °C (−30 °F) to −3.8 °C (25 °F)). It is also hardy to WHZ 4–9, and within Europe H2. The leaves often survive the winter. Due to this hardiness it is assumed fairly easy to grow.

Although it prefers saline soils, it is tolerant of many garden soils. It prefers positions in full sun or partial shade. Sometimes slugs can be a pest, and can nibble on the young shoots.

It can take several years to start flowering again after being moved, but once settled, it can develop into a large round clump.

It also could be grown within an orchard and is also good for use within a cutting garden.

It has gained the Royal Horticultural Society's Award of Garden Merit.

== Propagation ==
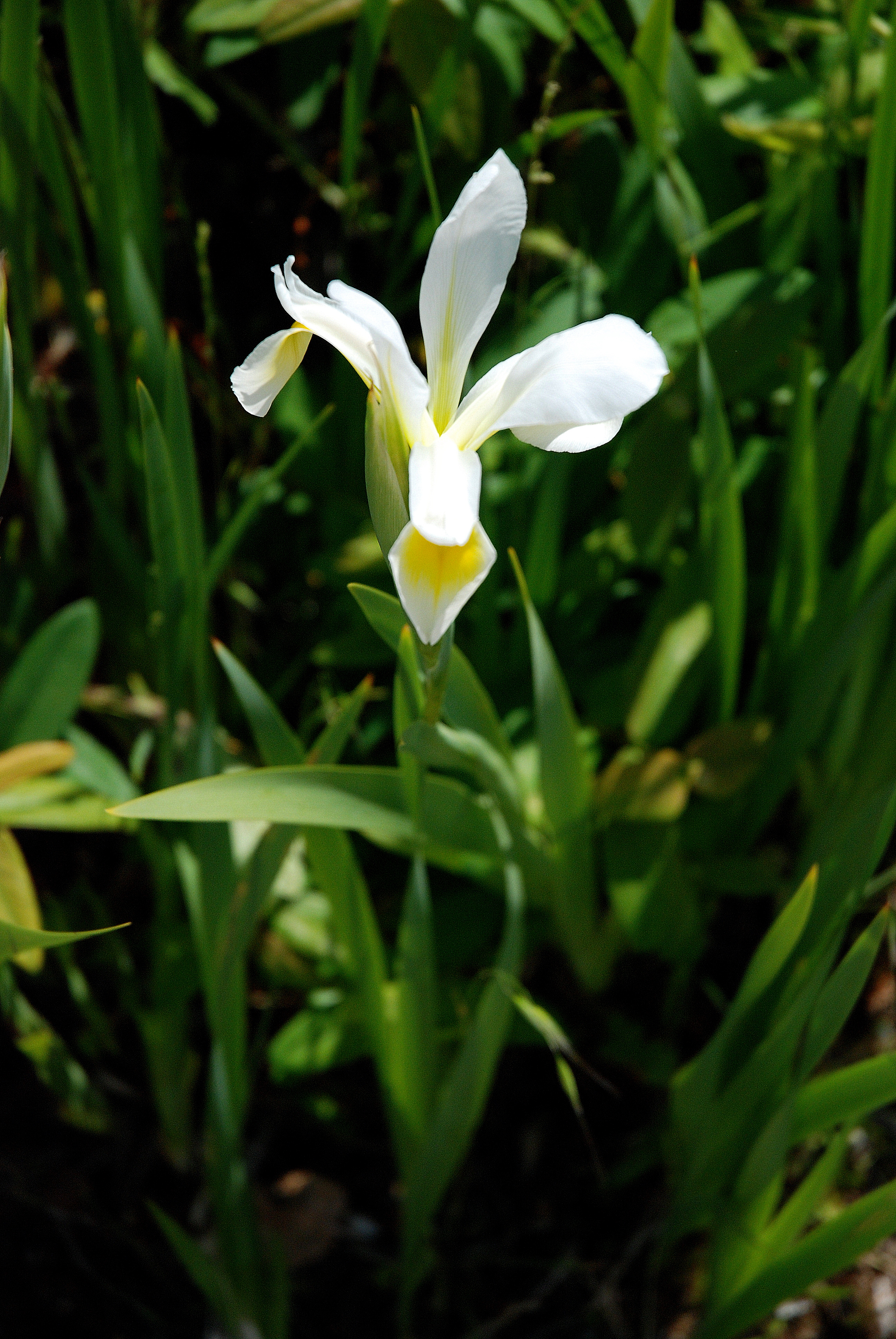

It can also be propagated by division or by seed growing, after allowing the capsules to mature and then break to release the seeds.

== Toxicity ==
Like many other irises, most parts of the plant are poisonous (rhizome and leaves), if mistakenly ingested can cause stomach pains and vomiting. Also handling the plant may cause a skin irritation or an allergic reaction.

== Uses ==
It has been listed with Iris paradoxa and Iris spuria subsp. musulmanica as a suitable halophyte crop.

== Hybrids and cultivars ==
Iris orientalis has been extensively used in creating various hardy cultivars, due to its 'tough' nature.

A well known cultivar is 'Shelford Giant', an extra large clone, which was found near Ephesus (in Greece). Published by Foster in 1913. It has long, erect, strap-like leaves that are evergreen and can survive the winter. It has stems that grow up to 2m tall. In early summer, it produces yellow and white flowers, that are 6–8 cm in width. The falls have a deeper yellow central patch. It has gained the RHS's Award of Garden Merit (RHS AGM), since 1994.

Another cultivar is 'Frigia', introduced in 1990 by Rodionenko from St. Petersburg. It has tall stems with up to 5 pure white flowers. It is vigorous and hardy but should not be transplanted too often.

Iris orientalis has had the following registered American cultivars: 'Canari', 'Copa D'ora', 'Ochroleuca Double', 'Ochroleuca Ephesus', 'Ochroleuca Gigantea', 'Ochroleuca Innocence', 'Ochroleuca Queen Victoria', 'Ochroleuca Reflex', 'Ochroleuca Snowflake', 'Ochroleuca Sulphurea', 'Ochroleucha Warei', 'Rocky Mountain Park', 'Yellow Crest'.
