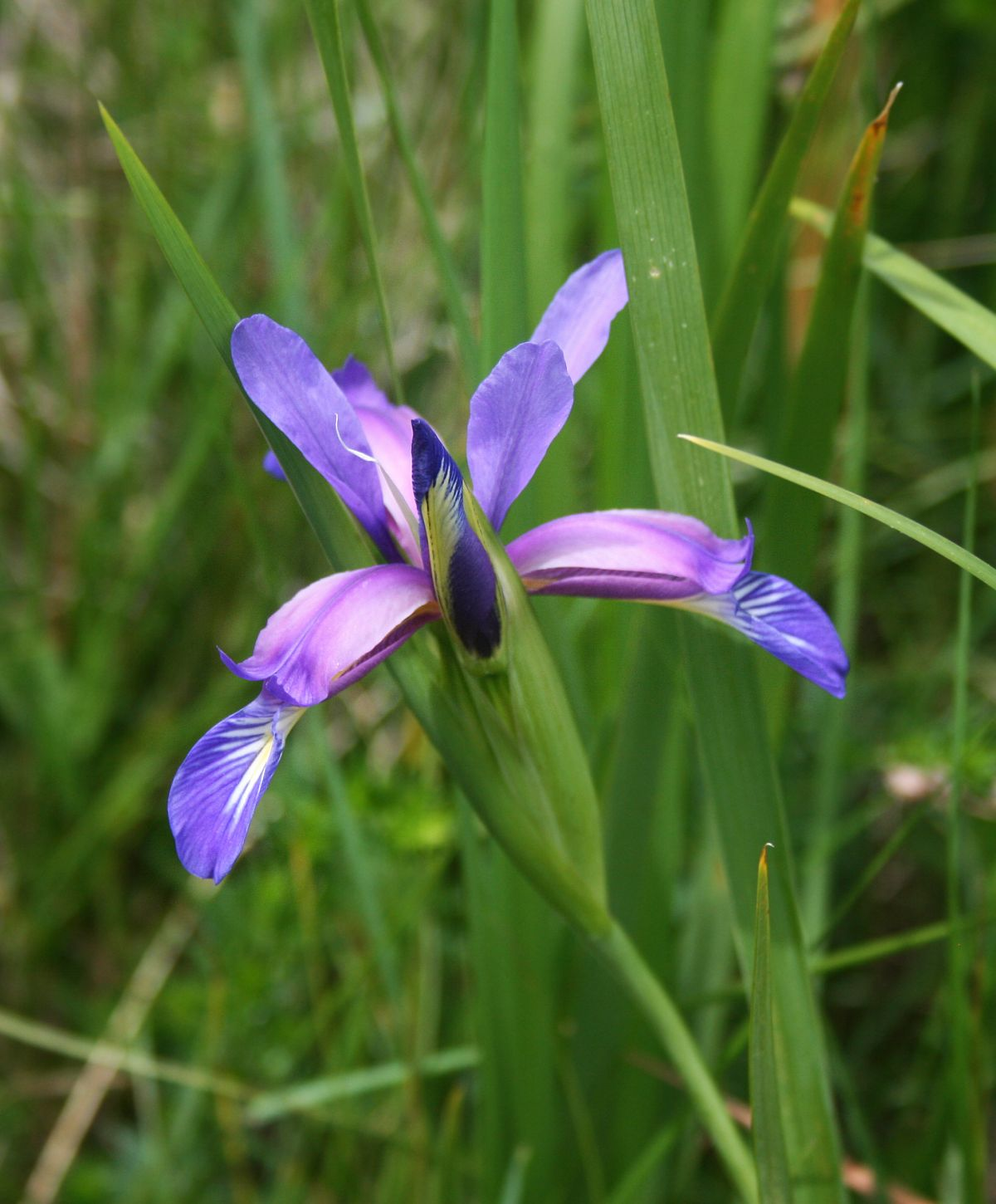
- Iris graminea

Scientific classification
- Kingdom: Plantae
- Clade: Tracheophytes
- Clade: Angiosperms
- Clade: Monocots
- Order: Asparagales
- Family: Iridaceae
- Genus: Iris
- Subgenus: Iris subg. Limniris
- Section: Iris sect. Limniris
- Series: Iris ser. Spuriae

= Iris ser. Spuriae =

Group of flowering plants

Iris series Spuriae are a series of the genus Iris, in Iris subg. Limniris. They are sometimes commonly known as butterfly irises.

The series was first classified by Diels in Die Natürlichen Pflanzenfamilien (Edited by H. G. A. Engler and K. Prantl) in 1930. It was further expanded by Lawrence in Gentes Herb (written in Dutch) in 1953.

All species in the series, have woody rhizomes and wiry looking roots. They have narrow upright, deciduous leaves. They produce clusters of flowers on unbranched stems, but can have branches but they are so close together, they still look like clusters. The flowers are similar in form to Dutch Irises, having narrow petals. The flowers have 3 nectar drops at the base of the falls. The flowers can be used for cutting. The flowers are also attractive to bees.

They also have seedpods, with 3 pairs of ridges along the pod lengths.

They tolerate a wide range of conditions (sun or semi-shade, wet or dry). They even tolerate clay or sandy soils.

They were first hybridized in the late 19th century. Michael Foster bred Iris monnieri and Iris spuria, to create Iris 'Monspur'.

Includes;

- Iris brandzae Prod.
- Iris crocea Jacquem. ex R.C.Foster (including I. aurea)
- Iris graminea L.
- Iris halophila Pall.
  - Iris halophila var. sogdiana (Bunge) Grubov
- Iris kerneriana Asch. & Sint.
- Iris ludwigii Maxim.
- Iris notha M.Bieb
- Iris orientalis Mill. – yellow-banded iris
- Iris pontica Zapal.
- Iris pseudonotha Galushko
- Iris sintenisii Janka
- Iris spuria – blue iris
  - Iris spuria subsp. carthaliniae (Fomin) B.Mathew
  - Iris spuria subsp. demetrii (Achv. & Mirzoeva) B.Mathew
  - Iris spuria subsp. maritima (Dykes) P.Fourn.
  - Iris spuria subsp. musulmanica (Fomin) Takht.
- Iris xanthospuria B.Mathew & T.Baytop

== Hybrids ==
Many hybrids have developed over the years. Including several that have gained the RHS's Award of Garden Merit (RHS AGM);

- Iris 'Belise' (1m in height, with erect sword-shaped leaves and erect stems bearing 5–6 flowers with orange-edged violet standards and violet-veined white falls).
- Iris 'Destination' (1.3m, with long narrow leaves and up to 7 bright golden yellow flowers in late spring and early summer).
- Iris 'Kitt Peak' (tall plant with long blue-green leaves and deep violet-blue flowers, the falls with a bold yellow patch and veining).
- Iris 'Love for Leila' (tall deciduous perennial with blue-green leaves and straight stems bearing up to 4 deep purple flowers, the rounded falls with a diffuse central splash of yellowish-bronze).
- Iris 'Sunrise in Sonora' (tall and vigorous plant with long, erect grey-green leaves and stems to 1.2m, with up to four flowers, the standards deep maroon-purple merging into yellow below, the rounded falls yellow, blending into a narrow maroon margin).
- Iris 'Wyoming Cowboys' (a vigorous plant with glaucous foliage and stems to 1.3m tall, bearing up to four flowers, the rounded orange-yellow falls veined and suffused reddish-brown near the margin, the standards reddish-brown, fading to yellow at the base).
