= Division (horticulture) =

Division in horticulture is a method of asexual plant propagation in which a parent plant is separated into two or more parts that are capable of growing into individual plants.It is most commonly used for herbaceous perennials and plants with structures such as bulbs, clumps, or rhizomes, where each separate plant includes healthy roots and shoots that are necessary for its survival. Division is used to increase plant numbers, improve and rejuvenate plant health, and maintain desirable traits. The success of the technique depends on plant type, proper timing, and structure.

== Purpose and benefits ==
Division is used by gardeners to increase the stock of plants and support plant performance in the long run. Over time, many perennials that are herbaceous tend to expand from a central crown and start to clump up in the middle. If there is no periodic division occurring, these clumps can become overcrowded and stressed. The main purposes of dividing perennials include:

Overcrowding prevention - as perennials expand outwards, root systems start to compete for resources such as oxygen, nutrients, and soil moisture. A lot of root density in one area limits access to these resources, which eventually leads to reduced plant vigour. Dividing the congested clump restores a more balanced root-to-soil ratio.

Vegetative propagation - division is a reliable form of clonal propagation because each division genetically has the same tissue. For this reason, the final divided plants keep the characteristics of the parent plant.

Making older plants more lively - a lot of perennials start to experience reduced productivity as their central crown ages. When division is completed with the woody or senescent parts being removed, it allows younger and healthier growth to form. This enables more and healthier flowering performance and improves the overall plant structure.

Improving the airflow and reducing the likelihood of pests and diseases - when plants are overcrowded in one area, the air circulation within the canopy is reduced. This leads to other issues, such as an increase in humidity around the foliage. Having higher humidity can encourage fungal pathogens such as leaf spot diseases or powdery mildew. Overall, division improves microclimate conditions and reduces the susceptibility to diseases.

Expanding gardens for free - when perennials are divided and moved to other parts of the garden, it expands it over time for no added cost. By doing this, multiple new plants can fill any empty space in the garden, begin new garden beds, or even be shared with other people.

Encouraging growth that is manageable - some perennials like hostas and ornamental grasses can spread outside of their designated space if they are left alone over time. Dividing these plants can help keep their size manageable and prevent any overcrowding/taking over other parts of the garden.

== When to divide perennials ==
The best time to divide a perennial is when it is not flowering, so it is recommended to divide perennials that bloom in the fall in the spring, and perennials that bloom in the spring/summer in the fall. The ideal day to divide a plant is when it is cool, and there is rain in the forecast to avoid the plants drying out.

== Types of root and crown systems ==
There are multiple root and crown systems in perennials, which affect how you divide them. The five types of root and crown systems are:

Clumpers - these plants often contain fibrous roots, and sometimes are called offsets. Many smaller plants can be found growing from the base of the original plant. Each offset creates its own root system that can be divided into separate parts, which allows easy hand division with little damage. Examples of clumpers include daylilies and hostas.

Runners - these perennials often have thin rhizomes and stolons, and tend to spread/trail in the ground. They root along their nodes and send up new shoots above the soil. This creates multiple parts that can be divided. Examples of runners include bee balm and goldenrod.

Woody crowns - these plants usually contain fairly thick roots, where buds are compacted on a hardened base. To divide these, it is a little more difficult, as one has to wait until the plant is older with a mass of healthy roots. It is recommended to wait until the plant is large enough to divide into 3 to 4 pieces. Examples of woody crown plants include baptisia and peonies.

Thick rhizomes/tubers - these are considered stems that grow along or under the soil. They are modified roots that are thick and fleshy for food storage. Cutting through these roots is not hard, so using a knife or pruners is recommended to slice them into sections that include one or more buds. Two examples of thick rhizomes/tubers are cannas and dahlias.

Taproots and woody perennials - these are perennials that are classified as undividable. It is recommended not to divide this type and leave it alone. Examples of taproots and woody perennials include lavender and butterfly weed.

== Aftercare ==
After removing any plant divisions from the soil, it is heavily recommended to plant them as quickly as possible. It is also suggested to water them well at least once a day, twice if it is a dry and hot day. They can be potted up as individual plants to build size, and kept away from frost environments.

== Main signs to divide perennials ==
Over time, perennials will begin to show signs that they need to be divided. These are:

It produces fewer and lower quality flowers than in recent years.

Its leaves are becoming smaller and weaker.

It is in an overcrowded environment and is trying to compete with nearby companion plants.

The middle develops a dead spot/hole, looks sparse, and has weaker inner flower stalks.

The bottom has sparse foliage.

It cannot support its own weight.

== Tools ==
The tools typically used to divide perennials are:

Roundmouth or squared shovel.

Spade.

Non-serrated knife.

Garden fork.

Hand pruners/pruning shears.

Loppers.

Shears.

Gloves.

== When to divide common perennials ==
Common name	Latin name	Season to divide (US)	Frequency
Asters	Aster	Early spring	1-3 years
Beebalm	Monarda	Early spring	1-3 years
Black-Eyed Susans	Rudbeckia	Early spring	3-5 years
Hosta	Hosta	Early spring	5-10 years
Siberian iris	Iris siberica	Early spring/Fall	5-10 years
Purple cone-flower	Echinacea	Early spring/Fall	4 years
Lambs-ear	Stachys byzantina	Spring/Early Fall	2-3 years
Garden Phlox	Phlox paniculata	Early spring/Fall	3-4 years
Chrysanthemum	Chrysanthemum	Spring	1-2 years

== Other types of asexual propagation ==
Asexual propagation types include cuttings, layering, and division. The main types of cuttings are stem, leaf, and root. For stem cuttings, this is split into multiple types. These include tip/medial, cane, single eye, double eye, and heel. Layering includes tip, simple, compound, mound, and air.
