= Ulmus glabra 'Grandidentata' =

Elm cultivar

- Species: Ulmus glabra
- Cultivar: 'Grandidentata'
- Origin: Europe

The Wych Elm cultivar Ulmus glabra 'Grandidentata', listed as U. glabra var. grandidentata (Moss), may have been the tree first described by Dumortier in Florula Belgica, 25, 1827, as U. corylacea var. grandidentata (:large-toothed hazel-like elm), in cultivation before 1830. Green thought it a synonym of 'Cornuta'. 'Grandidentata' may be synonymous with U. glabra 'Corylifolia' (:hazel-leaved elm), which Green thought another synonym of 'Cornuta'.

== Description ==
The name implies distinctively large marginal teeth, perhaps differing from the 'horns' of 'Cornuta'.

== Pests and diseases ==
'Grandidenta' is susceptible to Dutch Elm disease.

== Cultivation ==
No authoritatively identified specimens are known to survive.

=== Putative specimens ===
A mature open-grown large-toothed U. glabra cultivar, matching a 1903 herbarium leaf-specimen mislabelled U. montana cucullata, stands in Niddrie Mains Road, Edinburgh (grafted at ground level; girth 1.4 m) (2016). The large teeth are present along the whole leaf-margin of short shoot-leaves as well as long ('Cornuta'). Though 'Cornuta'-like teeth may occur near the apex, they are rare, and do not resemble the slender 'horns' that usually appear in 'Cornuta' photographs. The tree is narrow-pyramidal, with upswept branches like a Huntingdon Elm.

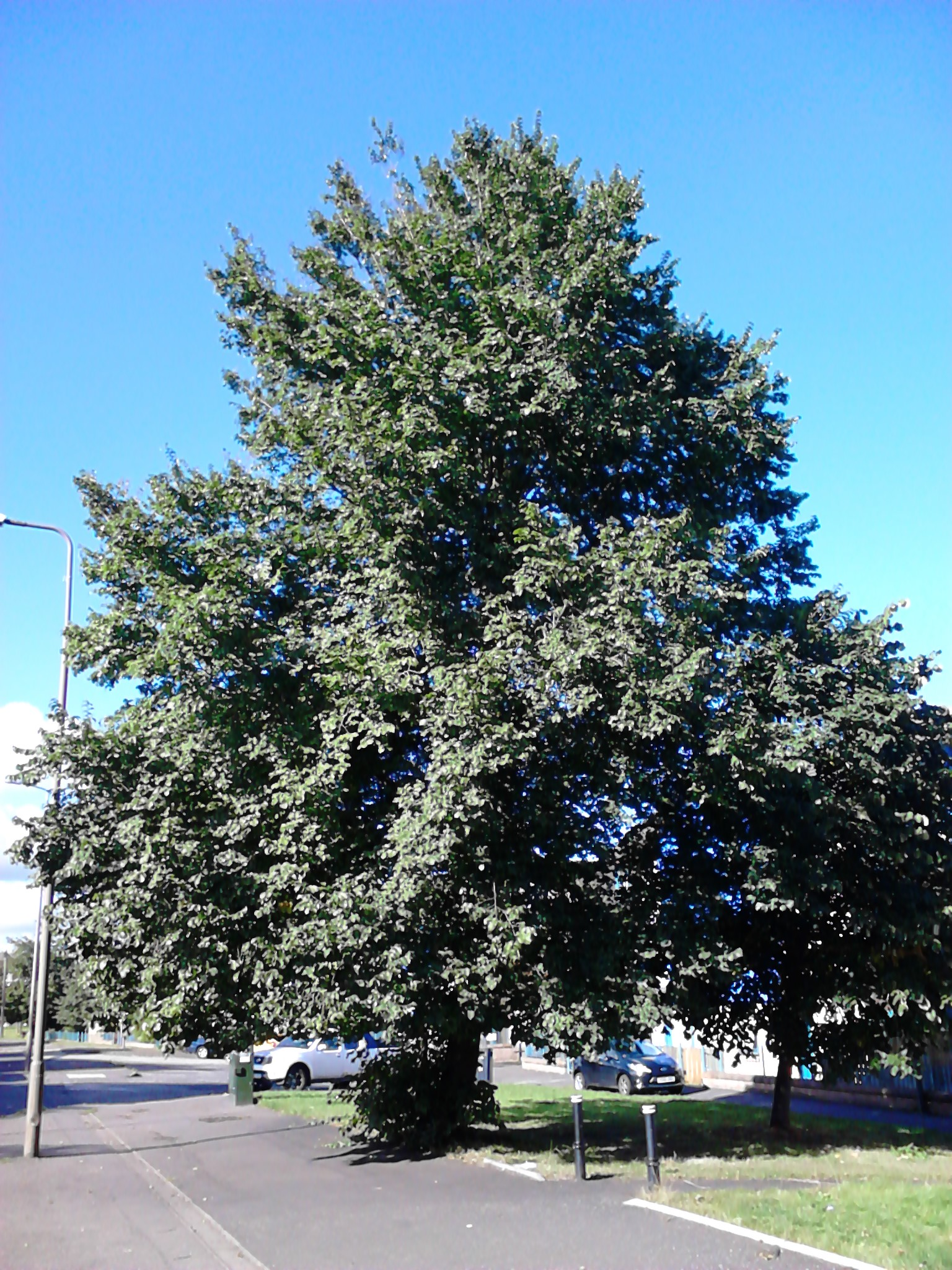
Possible 'Grandidentata', Edinburgh

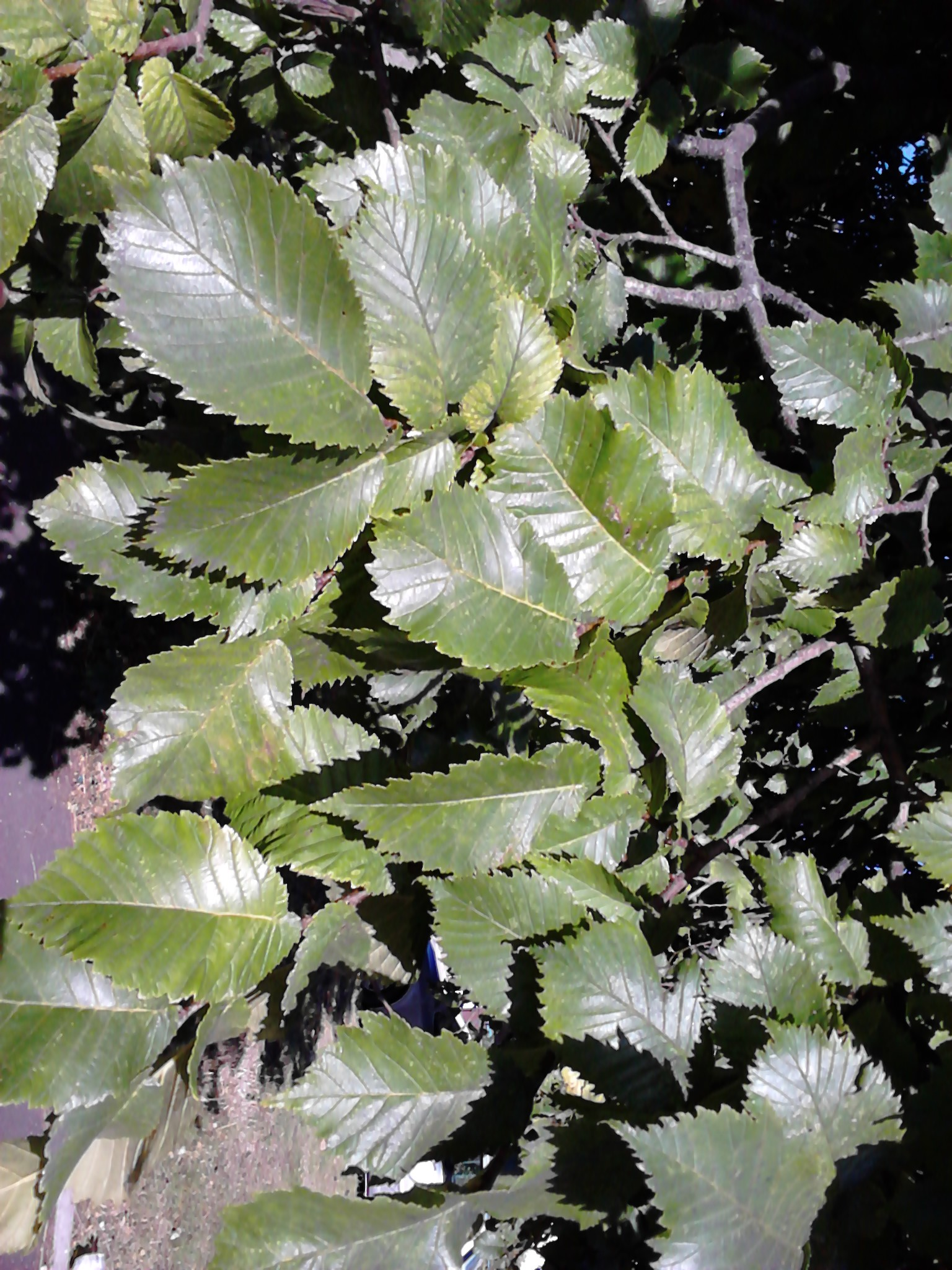
Leaves of same

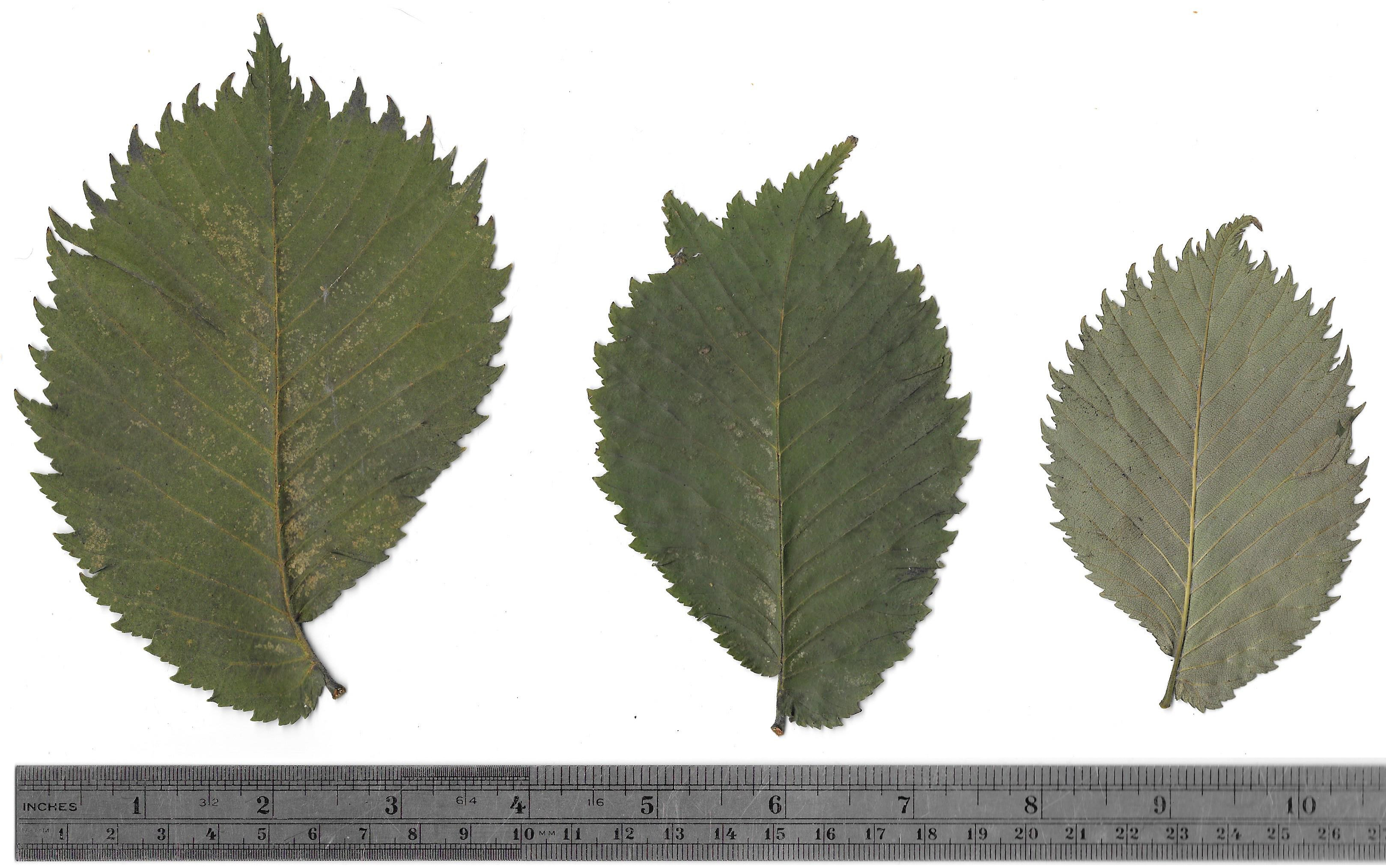
Dried short-shoot leaves of same (August)

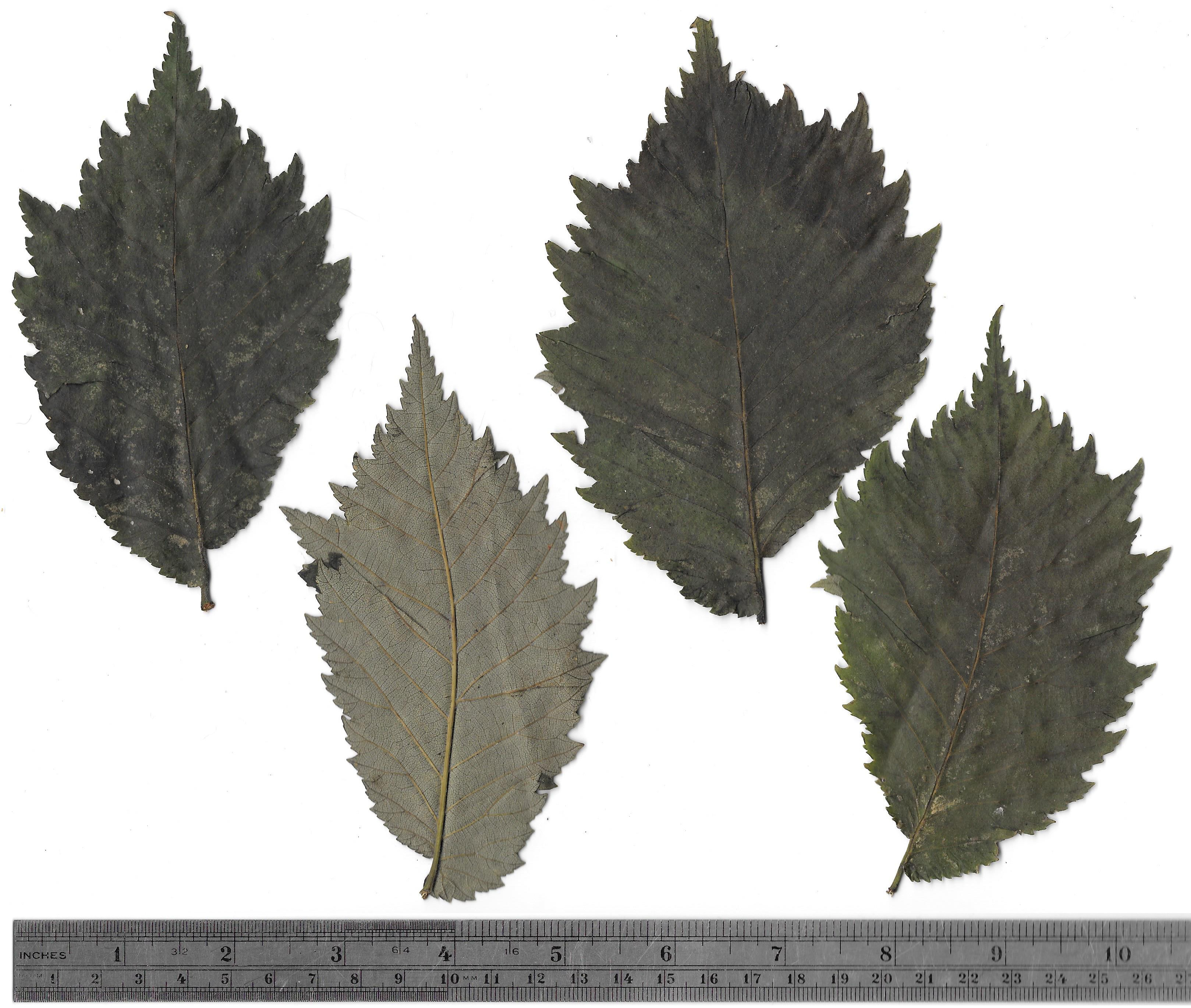
Dried long-shoot leaves

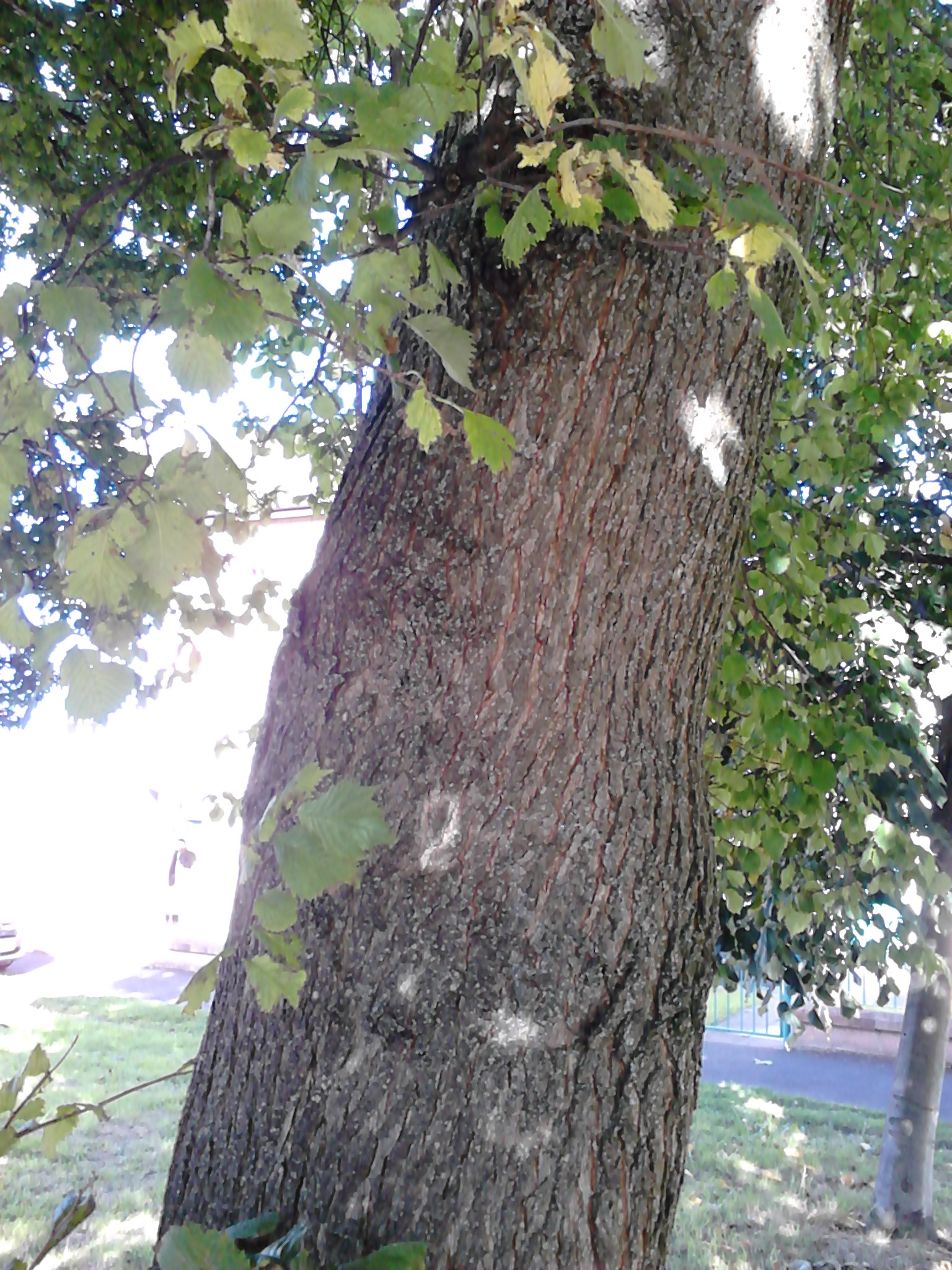
Bole

== Synonymy ==
- Ulmus corylacea var. grandidentata: Dumortier, Florula Belgica, 25, 1827 ?
- Ulmus Montana (: glabra) var. corylifolia: Zapalowicz, Conspectus Florae Galiciae Criticus 2: 98, 1908 ?
