= Čenkovská steppe and Čenkovská forest-steppe =

Coordinates: 47.7761°N 18.5292°E

Čenkovská steppe
- IUCN category III (natural monument or feature)
- Interactive map of Čenkovská steppe
- Area: 0.80 km^{2} (0.31 sq mi)
- Established: 1965
- Governing body: ŠOP - S-CHKO Dunajské luhy

Čenkovská forest-steppe or Čenkovská steppe is a nature reserve in Mužla, Nové Zámky District, Slovakia. It covers an area of 79.6 ha and has a protection level of 4 under the slovak law which corresponds with the IUCN level III.

== Description ==
The Čenkovská forest-steppe area was declared a protected area in 1965 and was last re-designated in 1988. It is the only national nature reserve in Slovakia to protect the Pannonian steppe ecosystem. This includes the protection of xerophile communities of sandy habitats of the Danubian Lowland, protected and endangered plants in the area include species such as Cotinus coggygria, Iris pontica, Ephedra distachya, Gypsophila fastigiata subsp. arenaria and several protected animals.
