= Ulmus glabra 'Corylifolia' =

Elm cultivar

- Species: Ulmus glabra
- Cultivar: 'Corylifolia'
- Origin: Europe

The putative Wych Elm cultivar Ulmus glabra 'Corylifolia' (: Hazel-leaved) was first described by Host in Flora Austriaca (1827). Another cultivar of the same name is described by Hugo Zapalowicz in Conspectus Florae Galiciae Criticus (1908), but was assumed to be 'Cornuta'. Herbarium specimens confirm that more than one clone has been labelled 'Corylifolia', some with longish petioles and with fruit more typical of Ulmus × hollandica hybrids.

== Description ==
Host described the tree as having broad-ovate scabrid leaves, doubly toothed with broad, obtuse teeth.

== Pests and diseases ==
See under Ulmus glabra.

== Cultivation ==
No confirmed specimens are known to survive.

=== Putative specimen ===
An elm with hazel-like leaves stands in Hove Recreation Ground, Hove, and may be similar to one of the cultivar 'Corylifolia'.

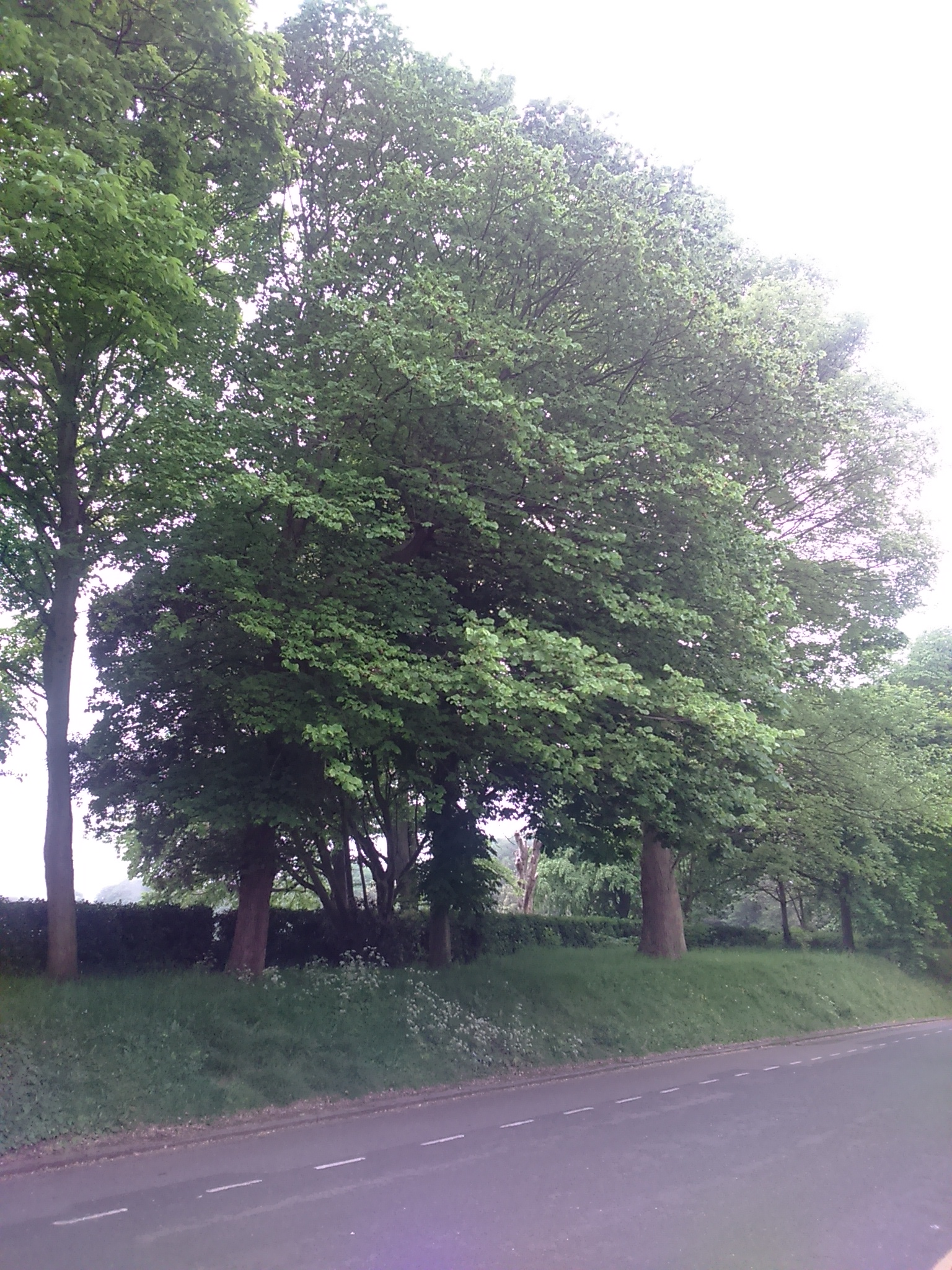
Hove Recreation Ground elm

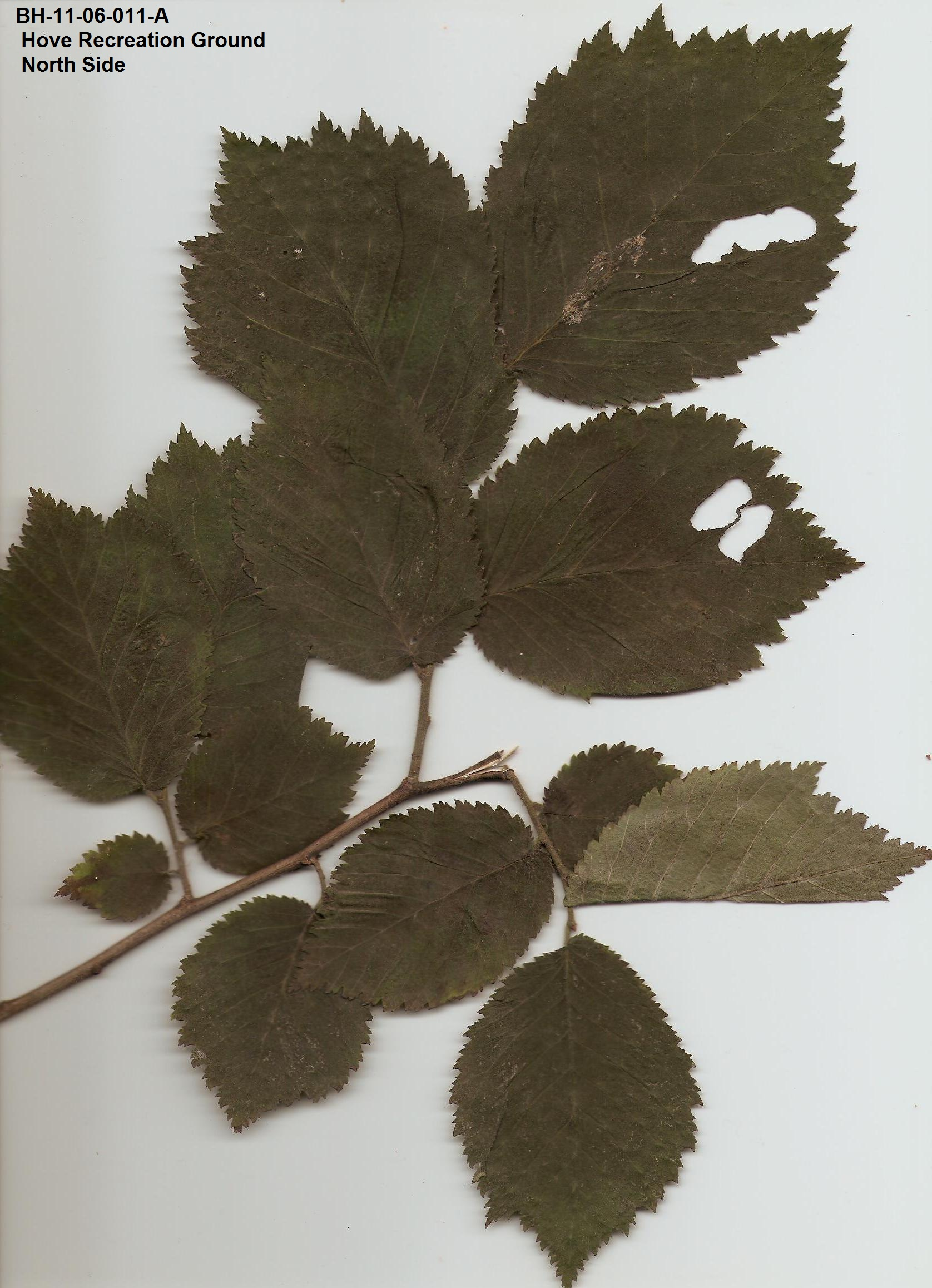
Leaves of same

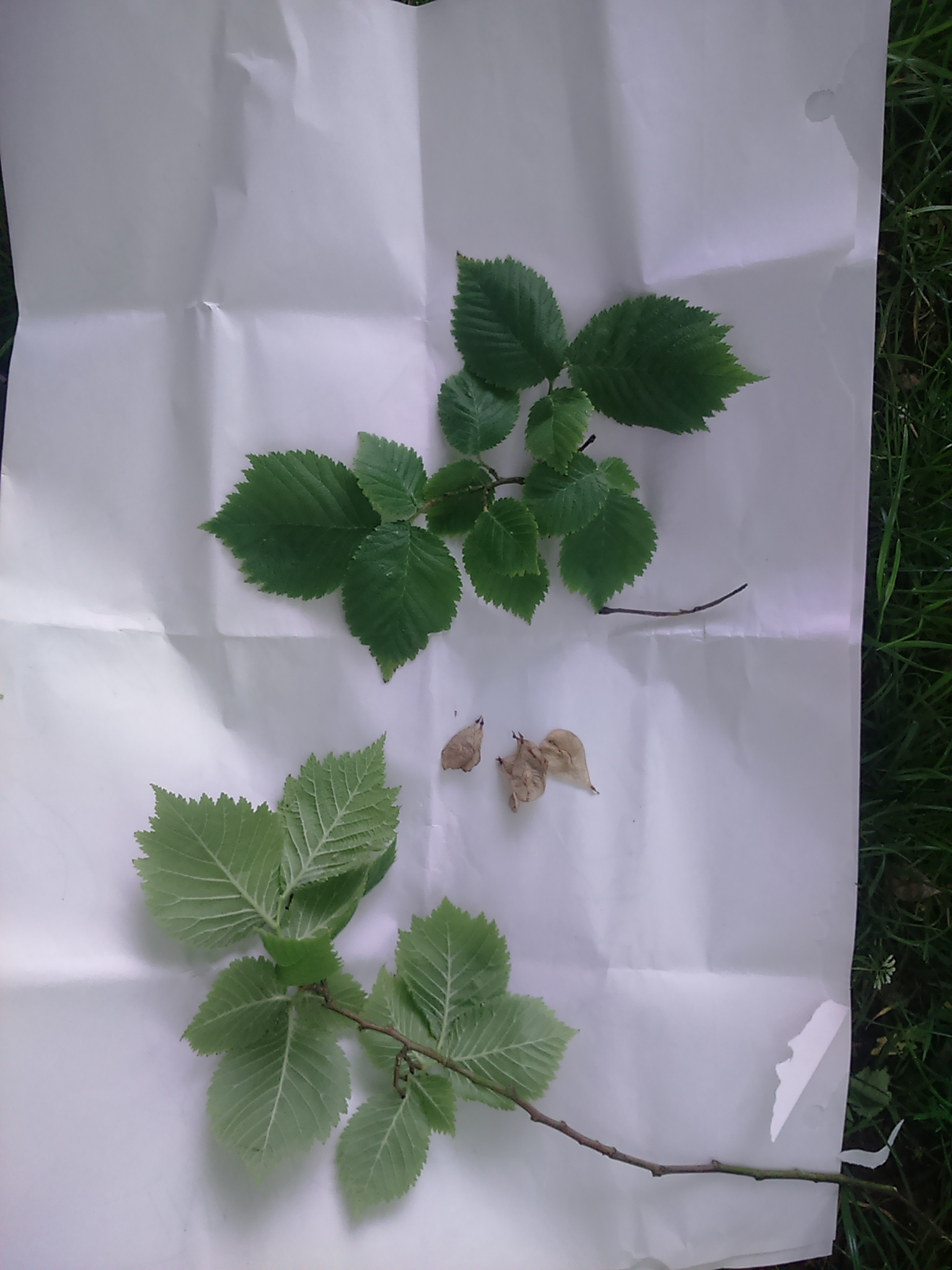
Foliage and samara

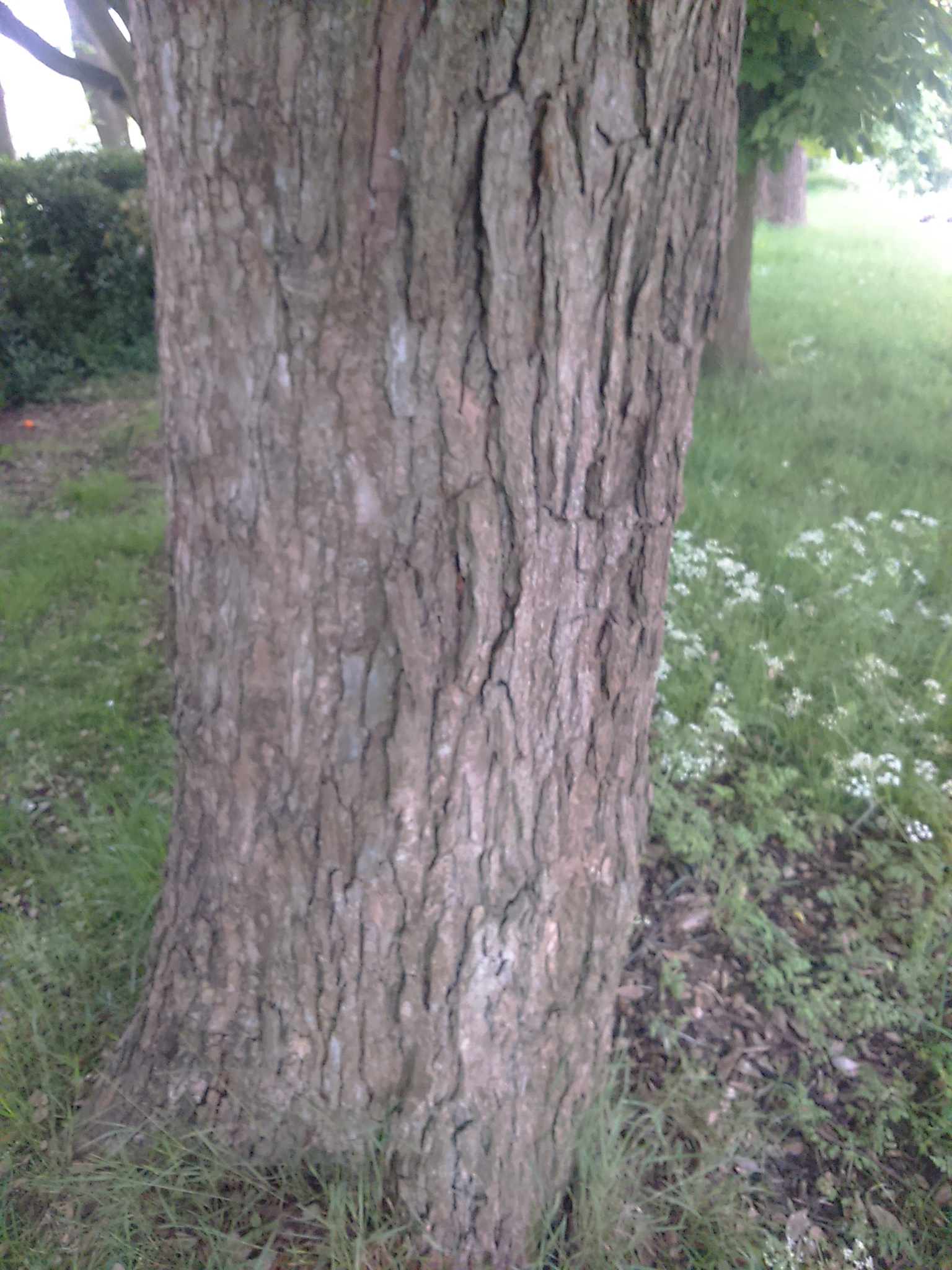
Bark of same
