= Pannonian Steppe =

Variety of grassland ecosystems found in the Carpathian Basin

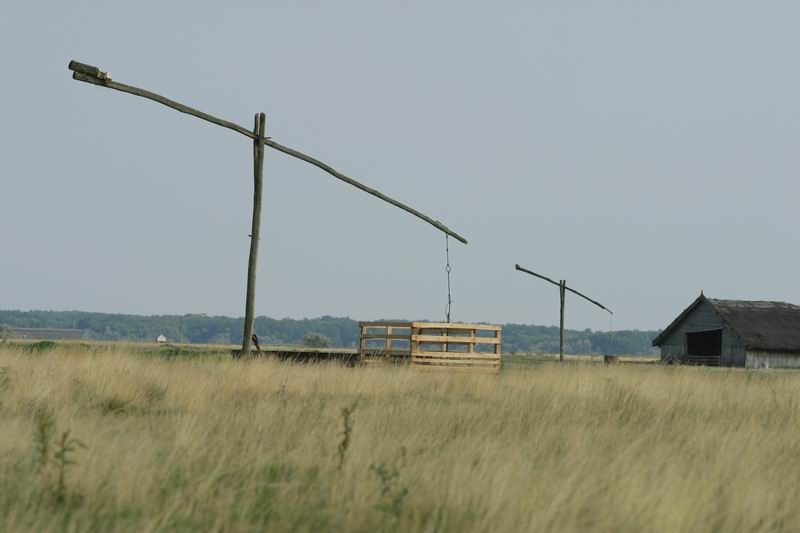
A typical draw well in the Pannonian steppe in Hortobágy National Park

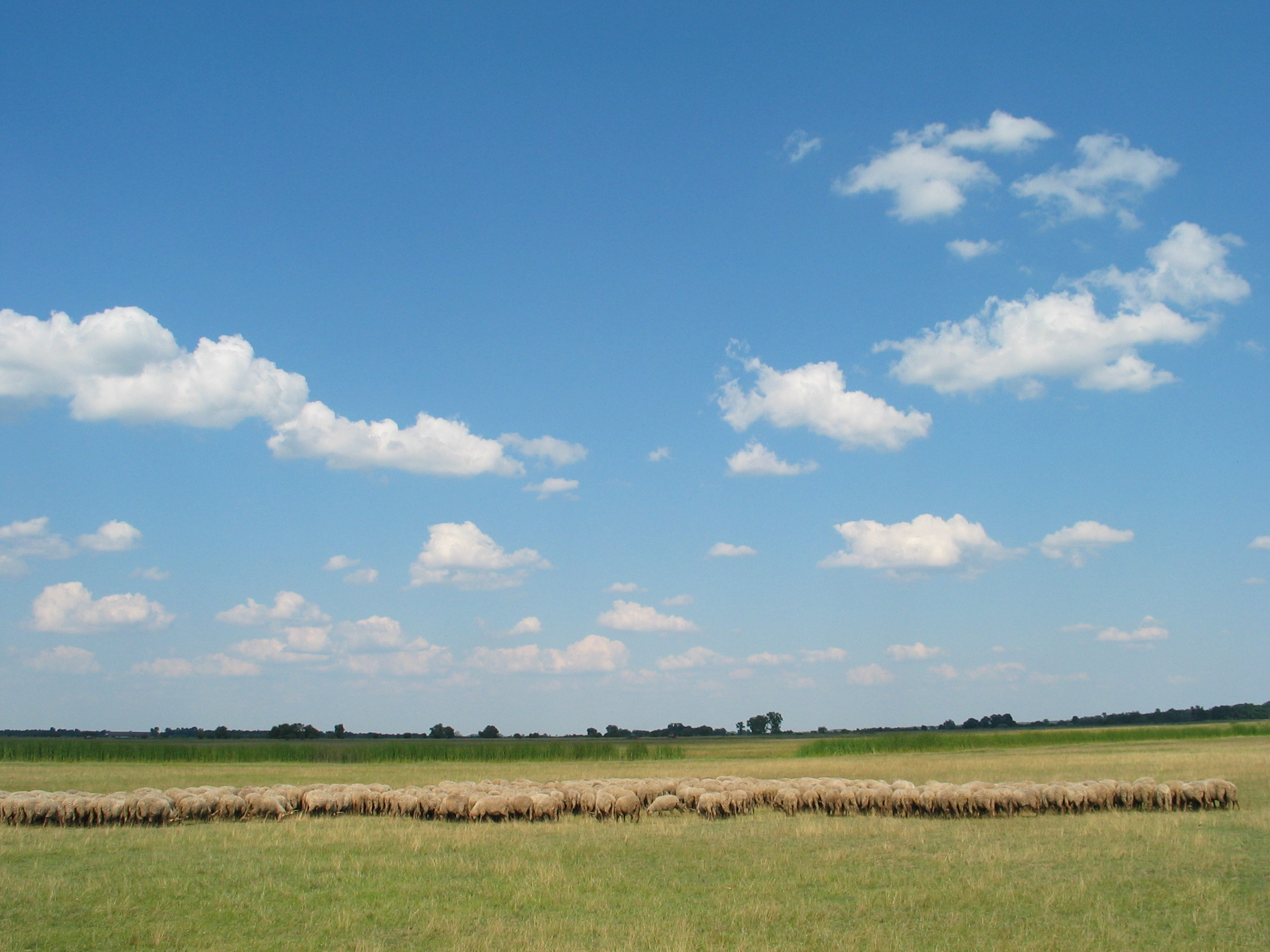
Hortobágy National Park

The Pannonian Steppe, or Peri-Carpathian Steppe, refers to a collection of grassland ecosystems encompassing most of Hungary, and parts of Romania, Bulgaria, Serbia, Slovakia and Austria. It forms the westernmost part of the Eurasian Steppe.

== Geography ==
The Pannonian Steppe is part of the Eurasian Steppe. Its climate is continental.

The part of the Pannonian Steppe in Hungary is a grassland biome on the Great Hungarian Plain (Alföld) around the River Tisza in the eastern part of Hungary as well as on the western part of the country. The landscape has been widely cultivated and the original landscape is now found only in a few places, for example in Hortobágy National Park.

The characteristic landscape is composed of treeless plains, saline steppes and salt lakes, and includes scattered sand dunes, low, wet forests and freshwater marshes along the floodplains of the ancient rivers. About three hundred species of birds can be found here.

The Čenkovská steppe near Mužla is the only steppe national nature reserve in Slovakia. The protected area declared in 1951 covers a total of 83 hectares.

Apart from the Čenkovská forest-steppe, other notable steppe and forest-steppe biomes in Slovakia are located mostly around the Danubian and East Slovak plains and the southern ranges of the Pramatra system. Two of the biomes are Devínska Kobyla and the Slovak Karst (connects to Aggtelek in Hungary).

Occasionally, the steppe is extended to Burgenland in Austria, mainly around Lake Neusiedl.

== See also ==
- Central Europe
- Southeast Europe
- Carpathian Basin
- Puszta
- Hortobágy National Park
