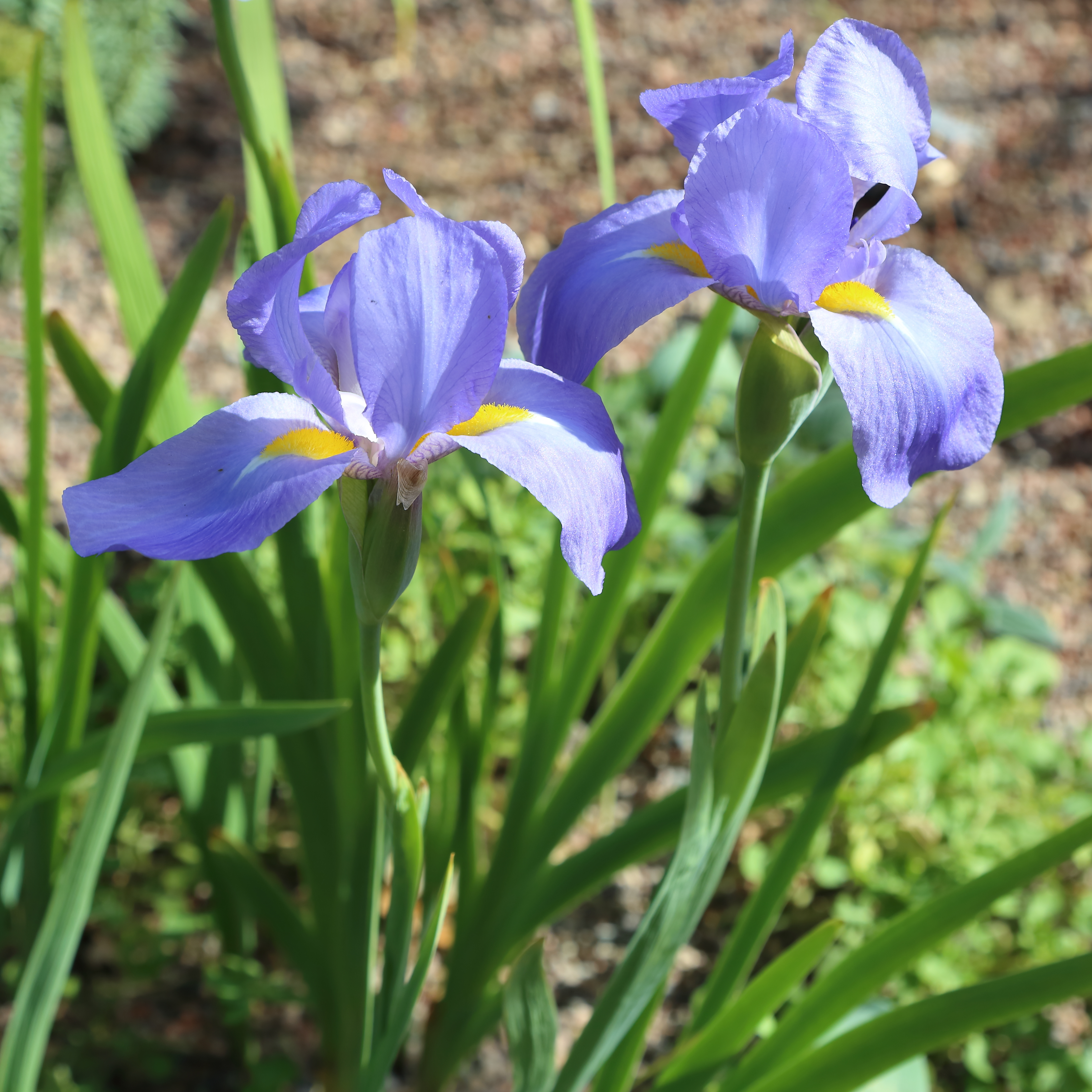

Scientific classification
- Kingdom: Plantae
- Clade: Tracheophytes
- Clade: Angiosperms
- Clade: Monocots
- Order: Asparagales
- Family: Iridaceae
- Genus: Iris
- Subgenus: Iris subg. Iris
- Section: Iris sect. Regelia
- Species: I. korolkowii

Binomial name
- Iris korolkowii Regel

Synonyms
- Iris korolkowii var. concolor Foster; Iris korolkowii var. leichtliniana Foster; Iris korolkowii var. venosa Foster; Iris korolkowii var. violacea Foster

= Iris korolkowii =

Species of plant

Iris korolkowii is a plant species in the genus Iris. It is also in the subgenus Iris and in the section Regelia. It is a rhizomatous perennial, from the mountains of Tien Shan, Pamir and Altai, in Afghanistan and Turkestan (now part of Uzbekistan). It is commonly known as the Redvein Iris. It has long, sword-shaped grey-green leaves, slender stem, and 2 to 3 white, cream, pale green or light purple flowers which are veined with maroon, chocolate brown or dark purple. It is cultivated as an ornamental plant in temperate regions.

== Description ==
It has thick or stout rhizomes, that are short and compact. It also has long secondary roots, the fleshy, thin stolons, that penetrate into the ground for minerals to feed the plant. They are shorter than Iris stolonifera and Iris hoogiana. The top of the rhizome, has the fibrous remains of last seasons leaves.

It has linear, ensiform (sword-shaped), glaucous leaves which are grey green, and are slightly tinged with purple at the base. They can grow up to between 30 cm (12 in) long, and between 0.5 and 1 cm wide. They are shorter than the flowering stem, and fade soon after the blooming period time has ended.

It has a slender erect stem, that can grow up to between 40–60 cm (16–24 in) tall.

The stems also have 2 spathes (leaves of the flower bud), that are membranous, green and ventricose (swollen or inflated), They can be 9–10 cm (4–4 in) long.

It has several short branches (or pedicels) near top of the plant.

The stems (and the branches) hold between 2 and 3 flowers, blooming in late spring and early summer, between April and May, or between May and June. In the United States, it flowers in mid to southern states between early April to early May and it also flowers in mid to northern states between late April to early June.

The flowers are 6–8 cm (2–3 in) in diameter. They are creamy white, ivory, yellow-white, or olive green, or light purple. They are veined with purple, chocolate brown, brown-purple, or dark maroon.

It has 2 pairs of petals, 3 large sepals (outer petals), known as the 'falls' and 3 inner, smaller petals (or tepals), known as the 'standards'. The falls are 7–11 cm (3–4 in) long, with a deflexed, and oblong blade. They have a dark signal patch and beard. The beard can be as dark as black, or black-brown. The oblong and erect, standards are 7–11 cm (3–4 in) long, similar in colour to the falls. It has a sparse beard.

It has a 2.5–3 cm long perianth tube, which is sub-cylindrical in shape. It has a brown, oblong and 4.5 cm (2 in) long style branch, which has scalloped lobes. The style is smaller than the beard.

After the iris has flowered, in August, it produces an oblong seed capsule, which is 3.8–5 cm (1–2 in) long. It is narrowed to a point at one end.

=== Biochemistry ===
As most irises are diploid, having two sets of chromosomes, this can be used to identify hybrids and classification of groupings. It has been counted several times, 2n=22, by Mitra in 1956, 2n=22 by Zakharyeva & Makushenko in 1969, 2n=33 by Simonet, in 1928, 2n=44 by Simonet in 1928 and 2n=22 by Gustafsson & Wendelbo in 1975. All known forms in cultivation are generally counted as 2n=22, or 2n=22, 33, 44.

Iris stolonifera and Iris hoogiana (other Regalia series irises) are tetraploid, 2n = 4x11 = 44.

== Taxonomy ==
It is pronounced as (Iris) EYE-ris (korolkowii) kor-ol-KOV-ee-eye.

It is occasionally known as Iris korolkowi (with 1 i at the end).

It is commonly known as the Redvein Iris.

It is known in Uzbek and parts of Russia as Iris Korol'kova.

It is known as stäppiris in Swedish. Which translates as Steppe Iris.

The Latin specific epithet korolkowii refers to General N. J. Korolkow. In 1872, he found the iris in Turkestan, in the mountains near Tashkent. He then sent the specimens to St Petersburg. In 1882, he also discovered Crocus korolkowii.

It was first published and described by Regel in Trudy Imp. S.-Peterburgsk. Bot. Sada Vol.2 page 432 in 1873. It is also noted that it was published in 'Enum. Pl. nov. Turest.' in 'Act. Hort. Petrop'. Vol. 2 page 432 in 1873.

Regel reported that it was found in Turkmenia, this was incorrect, as Korolkov had never collected plants in Turkmenia, as the mountains were unpassable.

The iris was also published with an illustration in 'Gartenflora' table 766 in 1873, and later by John Gilbert Baker in Curtis's Botanical Magazine, vol. 114 [series. 3, vol. 44]: table7025 in 1888.

Iris korolkowii was verified by United States Department of Agriculture and the Agricultural Research Service on 2 October 2014.

It is an accepted name by the RHS.

== Distribution and habitat ==
Iris korolkowii is native to temperate areas of central Asia.

=== Range ===
It is found in north east Afghanistan, within the Badakhshan region.

It is also found in the former USSR republic, of Turkestan. Turkestan now forms part of Uzbekistan. The iris has been found in Tashkent Province in Uzbekistan.

It is found within the Tien Shan, (including the valleys and gorges of the Talas Alatau,) Pamir and Altai mountain ranges.

=== Habitat ===
It grows on the dry rocky slopes of mountains.

They can be found at an altitude of 1,600–3,900 m (5,200–12,800 ft) above sea level.

== Cultivation ==
It is hardy to USDA Zone 5, although could be possibly between Zone 6 to Zone 9. It is hardy to European Zone H4.

It prefers to grow in well-drained soils, such as gritty and sandy but stiff loamy soil (suggested by Sir Michael Foster), but can tolerate all garden soil types.

It prefers positions in full sun, with at least 3 or more hours of direct sunlight every day.

It prefers average moisture needs during the growing period.

It needs a period of dryness and warmth during summer, between June and July. If the plants are too long exposed to moisture, they are prone to viral diseases.

It can be grown in garden borders, especially at the front of a border.

But it is best grown in a bulb frame, or in a hot sand bed. In northern regions (including Russia), the iris will suffer from insufficient sun and warmth and from an excess of moisture, which means the plant dies within 2 or 3 years.

It is rare in cultivation, and only found in specialised bulb nurseries.

It is best planted (within the garden) in October in UK.

=== Propagation ===
It can be propagated by division or by seed growing.

=== Hybrids and cultivars ===
Iris korolkowii has been crossed with Iris stolonifera, it produces very richly coloured hybrids, of which have conspicuous beards that are either dark brown or deep blue.

There are many collected forms. including forms found near Bokhara.

The hybrids normally have two flowers per stem, (compared to the main form which has between 2 and 3 flowers).

Sir Michael Foster published in the Gardeners' Chronicle 14 July, p36 in 1888, four varieties. 'Concolor', which has bright lilac-purple flowers,'Leichtlini', (or Leichtliniana,) which has creamy white flowers marked with a blackish purple blotch at the base of the falls, 'Venosa', which has greyish lilac flowers distinctly veined with purple, and 'Violacea', which has violet or puce coloured flowers with darker veins These were later re-classified as synonyms of Iris korolkowii.

Other known cultivars include; 'Korolkowii Atropurpurea', 'Korolkowii Brown And Green', 'Korolkowii Incarnata', 'Korolkowii Pink' and 'Korolkowii Polyploid Form'.

Iris korolkowii 'Smidgen', was registered in 1933.

== Sources ==
- Aldén, B., S. Ryman & M. Hjertson. 2009. Våra kulturväxters namn – ursprung och användning. Formas, Stockholm (Handbook on Swedish cultivated and utility plants, their names and origin).
- Czerepanov, S. K. 1995. Vascular plants of Russia and adjacent states (the former USSR).
- Khassanov, F. O. & N. Rakhimova. 2012. Taxonomic revision of the genus Iris L. (Iridaceae Juss.) for the flora of Central Asia. Stapfia 97:175.
- Komarov, V. L. et al., eds. 1934–1964. Flora SSSR. [lists as I. korolkowi Regel].
- Mathew, B. 1981. The Iris. 63.
- Rechinger, K. H., ed. 1963–. Flora iranica.
