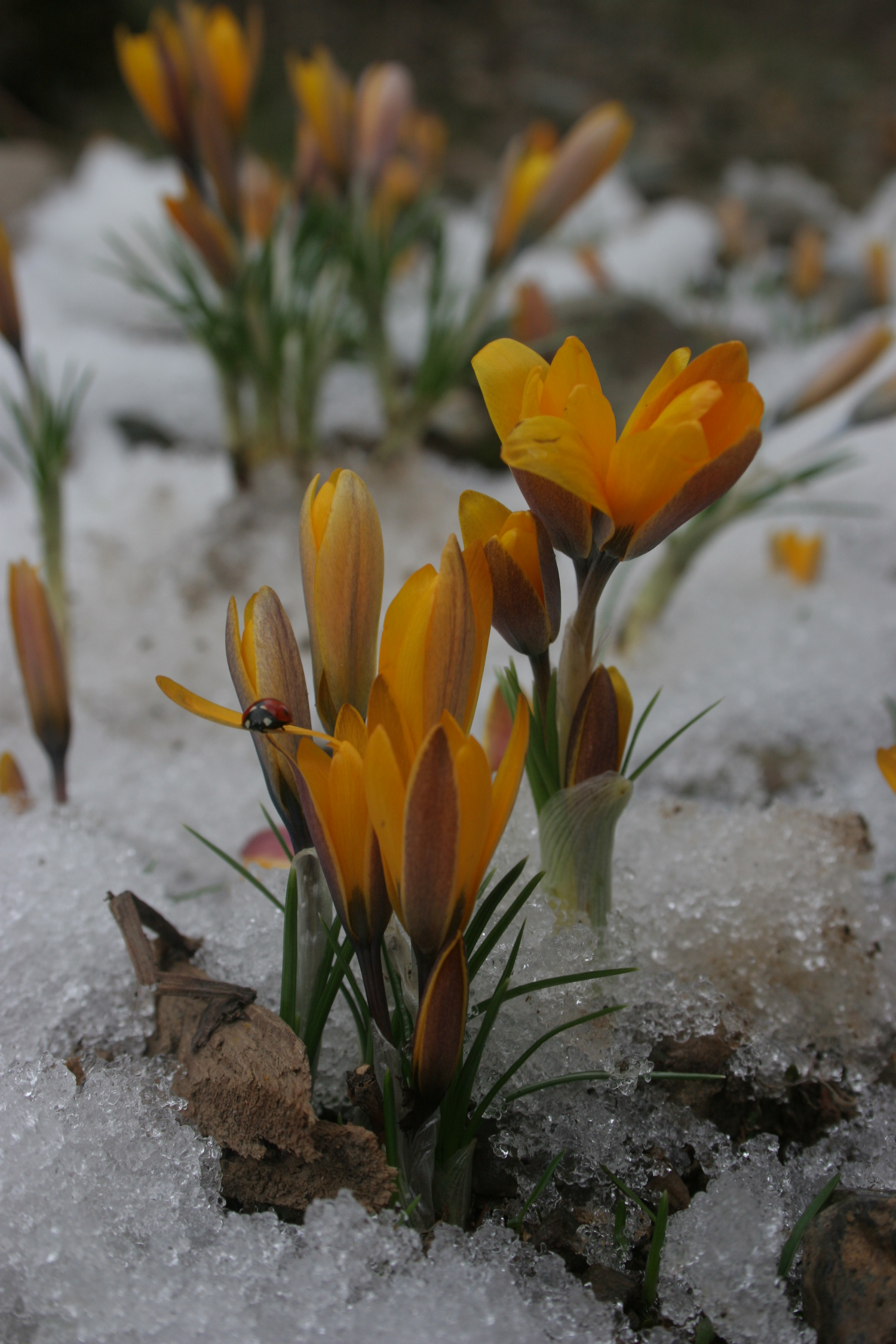
- Crocus korolkowii

Scientific classification
- Kingdom: Plantae
- Clade: Tracheophytes
- Clade: Angiosperms
- Clade: Monocots
- Order: Asparagales
- Family: Iridaceae
- Genus: Crocus
- Species: C. korolkowii

Binomial name
- Crocus korolkowii Maw & Regel

= Crocus korolkowii =

Species of flowering plant

Crocus korolkowii is a species of flowering plant in the genus Crocus of the family Iridaceae. It is a cormous perennial with a native range from central Asia to northern Pakistan.

It is found growing in stony and grassy areas ranging in altitude from 600 to 2600 meters; flowering occurs from February to May.

In cultivation it is easy in a bulb frame but also grown outside in some areas.
