= Ulmus glabra 'Cornuta' =

Elm cultivar

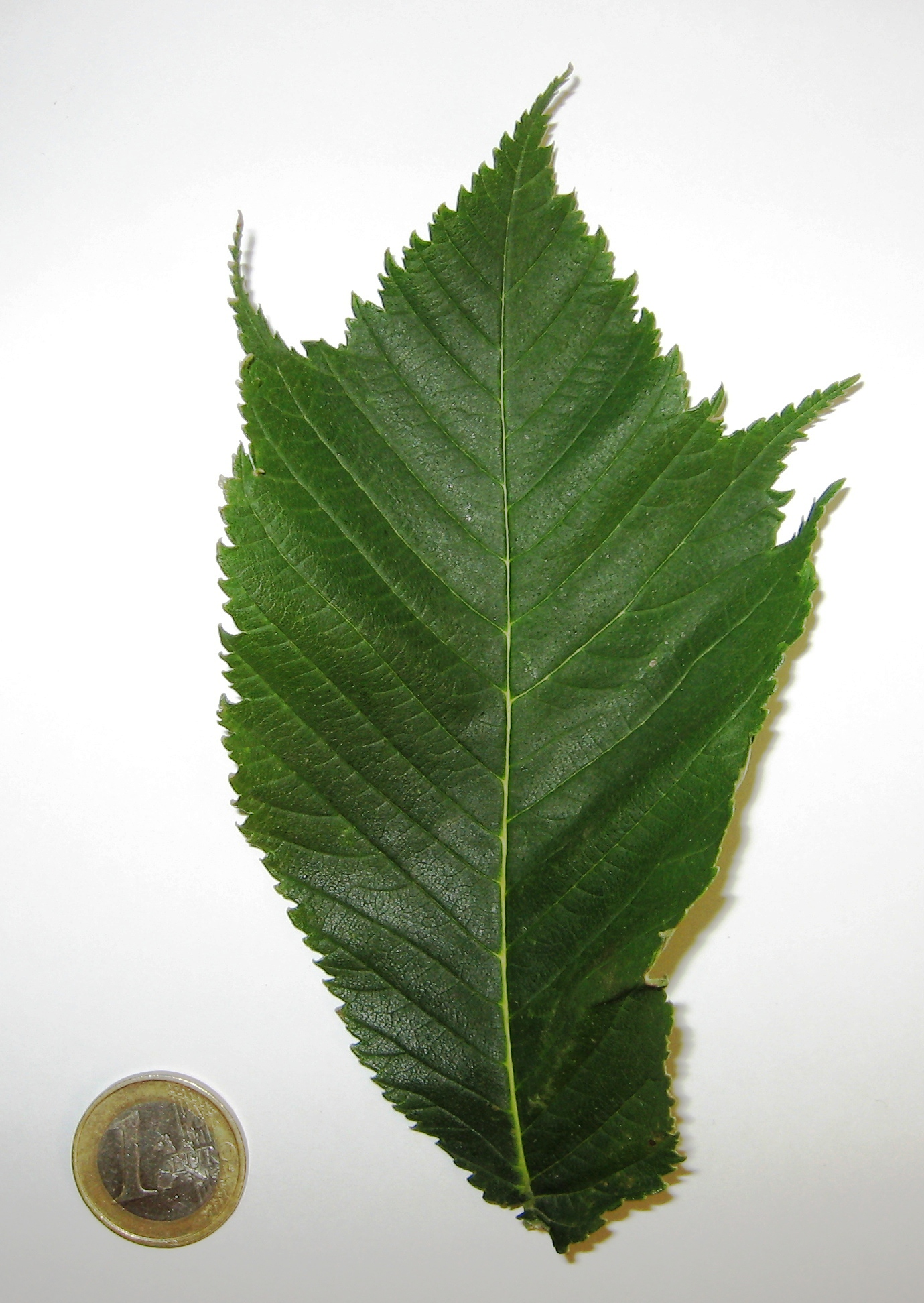
- Species: Ulmus glabra
- Cultivar: 'Cornuta'
- Origin: Europe

The Wych Elm cultivar Ulmus glabra 'Cornuta', in cultivation before 1845 – Fontaine (1968) gives its provenance as France, 1835 – is a little-known tree, finally identified as a cultivar of U. glabra by Boom in Nederlandse Dendrologie 1: 157, 1959.

The cultivar 'Triserrata', usually considered a synonym of 'Cornuta', was first described by Kirchner in Petzold and Kirchner (1864) as U. triserrata Hort.. It was distributed by the Späth nursery, Berlin, in the late 1890s and early 1900s as U. montana triserrata Kirch..

== Description ==
'Cornuta' is distinguished only by the one or two cusp-like lobes either side of the apex of the leaf on strong-growing shoots, similar to Ulmus laciniata. Short-shoot leaves lack the cusps. Fontaine (1968) reported that 'Cornuta' had a more reddish-brown autumn colouring than other elms.

U. triserrata Hort. (syn. U. intermedia Hort.) was described in Petzold and Kirchner as "very similar to U. montana, but the leaves appear to be firmer, a little shorter, and widened towards the tip. The tip is very sharp-pointed, likewise the two large teeth, one on each side, in consequence of which the leaf appears tricuspidate. A form similar in appearance but less pronounced occurs in U. montana." Späth catalogues describe the leaf of U. montana triserrata as "usually three-pointed", but herbarium leaf-specimens in the Royal Botanic Garden Edinburgh from Späth's specimens show a non-cuspidate leaf with a triserrate (triple-toothed) margin.

== Pests and diseases ==
A cultivar of the Wych Elm, 'Cornuta' is susceptible to Dutch Elm disease.

== Cultivation ==
Fontaine (1968) reported that a form of 'Cornuta' was cultivated along the Reguliersgracht, Amsterdam, "with reasonable success as a street tree". 'Cornuta' is now very rare in cultivation. Although introduced to North America, there is no record of its introduction to Australasia. One tree, possibly 'Cornuta', was planted in 1897 as U. montana laciniata syn. U. montana triserrata at the Dominion Arboretum, Ottawa, Canada. Three specimens supplied by Späth to the RBGE in 1902 as U. montana triserrata may survive in Edinburgh, as it was the practice of the Garden to distribute trees about the city (viz. the Wentworth Elm); the current list of Living Accessions held in the Garden per se does not list the plant. A specimen obtained from Späth as Ulmus triserrata and planted in 1916 stood in the Ryston Hall arboretum, Norfolk, in the early 20th century.

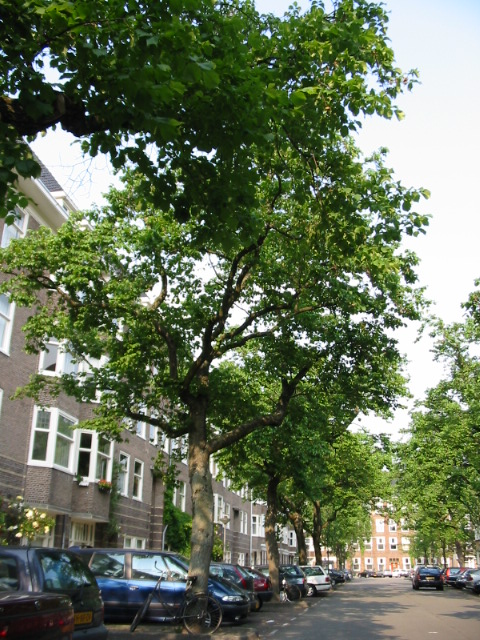
Avenue of grafted 'Cornuta', Milletstraat, Amsterdam

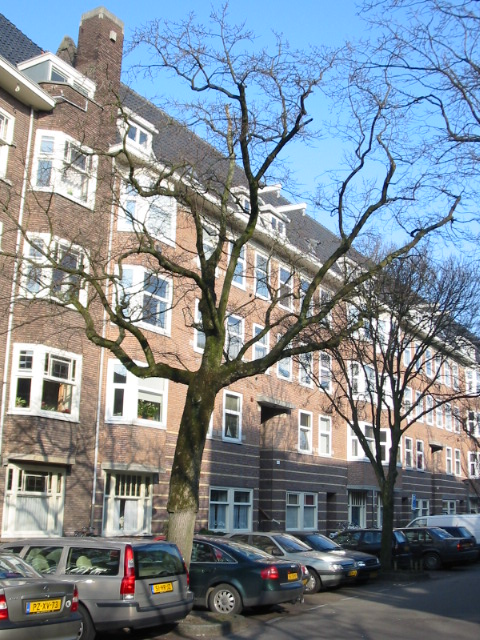
A pruned 'Cornuta' in the same avenue, showing graft.

== Notable trees ==
A very large tree survives at Meise, in Belgium; measured in 2002, it had attained a height of 35 m, and a d.b.h. of at 1.2 m. Several examples survive along Milletstraat in Amsterdam. Three heavily pruned trees, closely planted and now fused together as one stand behind the Centraal Museum in Utrecht, Netherlands.

== Accessions ==
North America

- Dominion Arboretum, Canada. Details not known.

Europe

- Brighton & Hove City Council, UK. NCCPG elm collection, as U. glabra var. cornuta., 1 tree, at Sussex University.
- Centrum voor Botanische Verrijking vzw, Kampenhout, Belgium.
- Hortus Botanicus Nationalis, Salaspils, Latvia. Acc. no. 18114,5,6,7.
- National Botanic Garden., Belgium. Details not known.
- Sir Harold Hillier Gardens, Ampfield, Hampshire, UK. Acc. no: 1982.0003.
- Wijdemeren City Council, Netherlands. Elm collection. 2 planted in De Kwakel, Kortenhoef (grafted on U. 'Lobel') 2009 + 2010.

== Synonymy ==
- Horned Elm: origin obscure
- Ulmus campestris cornuta: David, Revue horticole II. 4: 102, 1845.
- Ulmus corylacea var. grandidentata: Dumortier, Florula Belgica, 25, 1827.
- Ulmus glabra var. grandidentata (Moss))
- Ulmus intermedia Hort.: Kirchner, in Petzold & Kirchner, Arboretum Muscaviense, 565, 1864, as name in synonymy.
- Ulmus Montana (: glabra) var. corylifolia: Zapalowicz, Conspectus Florae Galiciae Criticus 2: 98, 1908.
- Ulmus Montana (: glabra) f. lobata: Waisbecker , Oesterreichische botanische Zeitschrift 49: 67, 1899.
- Ulmus Montana (: glabra) var. superba: Lavallée Arboretum Segrezianum 237, 1877.
- Ulmus scabra tricuspis
- Ulmus triserrata Hort. ex Dippel
