= Mužla =

Mužla Muzsla
- Municipality
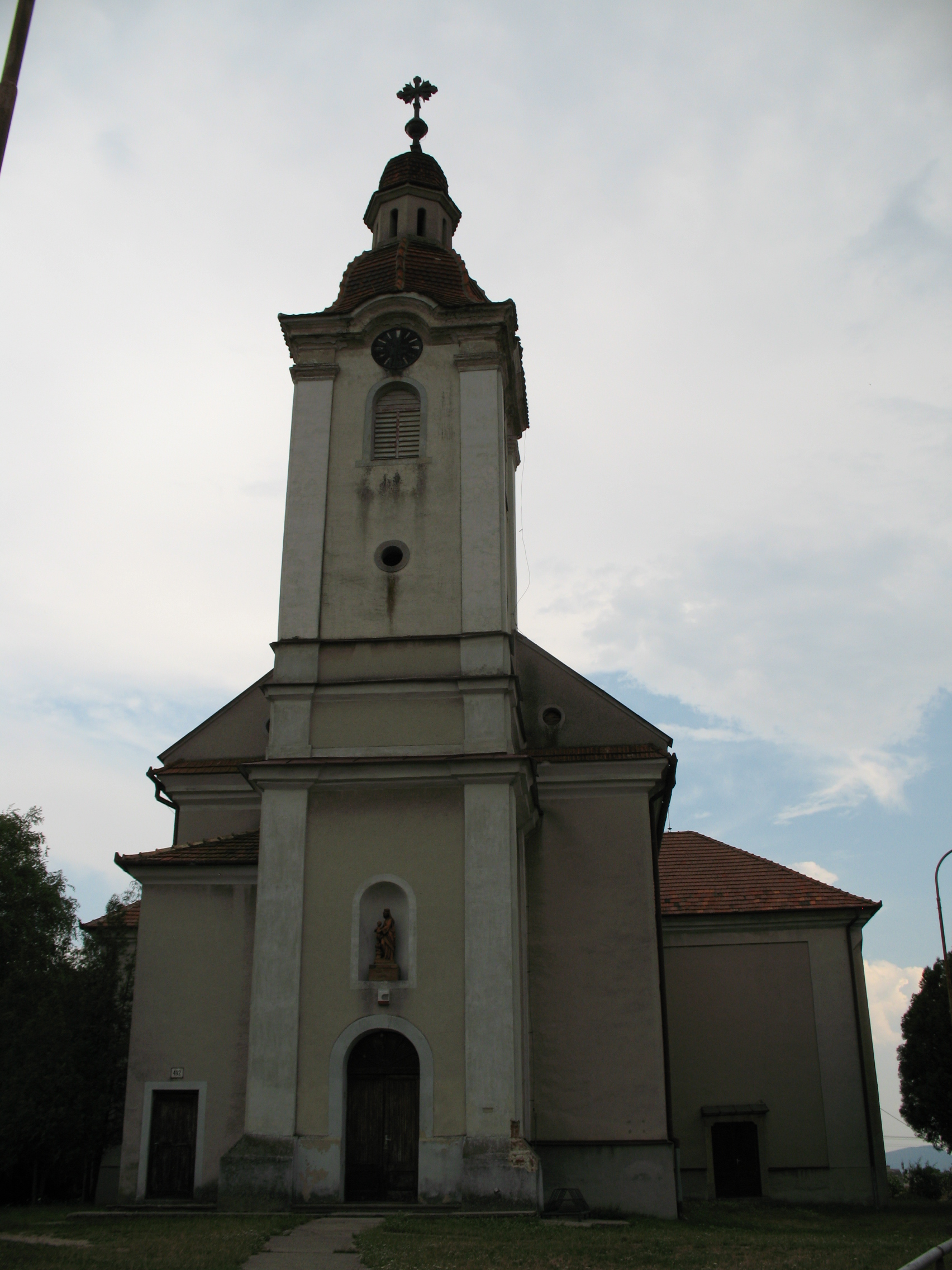

- Flag

- Location of Mužla in the Nitra Region Location of Mužla in Slovakia
- Coordinates: 47.80°N 18.60°E
- Country: Slovakia
- Region: Nitra Region
- District: Nové Zámky District
- First mentioned: 1156

Government
  - Mayor: Ing.Farkas Iván

Area
  - Total: 52.09 km^{2} (20.11 sq mi)
- Elevation: 121 m (397 ft)

Population (2025)
  - Total: 1,819
- Time zone: UTC+1 (CET)
  - Summer (DST): UTC+2 (CEST)
- Postal code: 943 52
- Area code: +421 36
- Vehicle registration plate (until 2022): NZ
- Website: muzla.sk

Mužla (Hungarian: Muzsla) is a village and large municipality in the Nové Zámky District in the Nitra Region of south-west Slovakia.

== Geography ==
The municipality lies at an altitude of 121 metres (397 ft) and covers an area of 52.09 km^{2} (20.11 sq mi) (2025).

== History ==
In historical records, the village was first mentioned in 1156. After the Austro-Hungarian army disintegrated in November 1918, Czechoslovak troops occupied the area, later acknowledged internationally by the Treaty of Trianon. Between 1938 and 1945 Mužla once more became part of Miklós Horthy's Hungary through the First Vienna Award. From 1945 until the Velvet Divorce, it was part of Czechoslovakia. Since then, it has been part of Slovakia.

== Population ==
Population statistic (10 years)
Year	1995	2005	2015	2025
Count	2005	1961	1885	1819
Difference		−2.19%	−3.87%	−3.50%

Population statistic
Year	2024	2025
Count	1838	1819
Difference		−1.03%

It has a population of 1819 people (31 December 2025).

=== Ethnicity ===
Census 2021 (1+ %)
Ethnicity	Number	Fraction
Hungarian	1566	81.9%
Slovak	343	17.93%
Not found out	111	5.8%
Romani	47	2.45%
Total	1912	

In year 2021 was 1912 people by ethnicity 1566 as Hungarian, 343 as Slovak, 111 as Not found out, 47 as Romani, 11 as Czech, 9 as Other, 4 as German, 3 as Italian and 1 as Russian.

Note on population: The difference values of population numbers in the table "Population statistic" and in the sections "Ethnicity" & "Religion" is caused by the use of various statistical methods.

=== Religion ===
Census 2021 (1+ %)
Religion	Number	Fraction
Roman Catholic Church	1263	66.06%
None	431	22.54%
Not found out	121	6.33%
Calvinist Church	40	2.09%
Total	1912	

In year 2021 was 1912 people by religion 1263 from Roman Catholic Church, 431 from None, 121 from Not found out, 40 from Calvinist Church, 12 from Jehovah's Witnesses, 10 from Buddhism, 8 from Christian Congregations in Slovakia, 8 from Greek Catholic Church, 8 from Evangelical Church, 3 from Jewish community, 3 from Other and not ascertained christian church, 3 from Ad hoc movements, 1 from Other and 1 from Czechoslovak Hussite Church.

== Facilities ==
The village has a small public library.

=== Twin towns — Sister cities ===
Mužla is twinned with:

- Nyergesújfalu, Hungary
- Mužlja, Serbia
