= Johann Gottlieb Georgi =

German scientist (1729–1802)

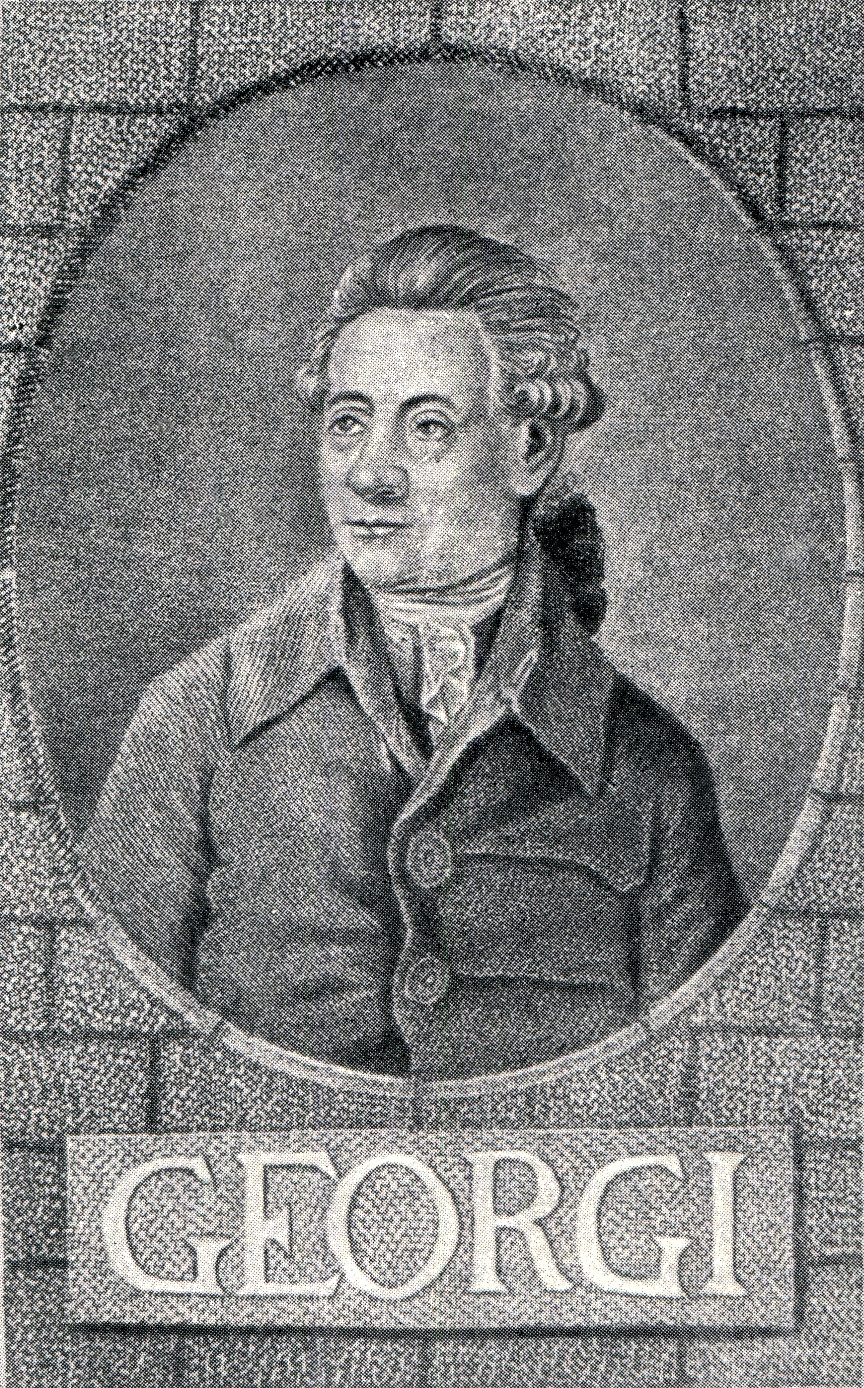
Johann Gottlieb Georgi.

Johann Gottlieb Georgi (Russian: Иоганн Готлиб Георги, romanized: Iogann Gotlib Georgi; 31 December 1729 – 27 October 1802) was a German-Russian botanist, naturalist and geographer.

== Life ==
A native of Pomerania, Georgi accompanied both Johan Peter Falk and Peter Simon Pallas on their respective journeys through Siberia. In 1770–1774, he travelled on its behalf to Astrakhan, the Urals, Bashkir, the Barabinsk steppe, the Kolyvanskoe silver mines (to assess the ore content), Altai, Tomsk, Irkutsk, Baikal, and Dauren. In 1783, he became an academician of the Russian Academy of Sciences in St. Petersburg.

Georgi was particularly interested in the Baikal region. Based on collections from far eastern Russia, in his 1775 publication Bemerkungen einer Reise im Russischen Reich im Jahre 1772, Georgi provided the first botanical descriptions of many of the region's flowering plants, among them the Baikal skullcap (Scutellaria baicalensis). Many of these plants and herbs were later collected by European botanists in China, and thereafter became rare specimens in European botanical gardens.

After his fellow botanist and travelling companion Falk killed himself in 1774, Georgi edited his notes, which were published in Germany from 1785 to 1786 as Beyträge zur topographischen Kenntniss des Russischen Reichs I – III.

In 1790, Georgi's description and urban plans of the city of St. Petersburg was published in German. It appeared in a second edition in Riga in 1793 and was finally translated into Russian a year later. His Geographisch-physikalische und naturhistorische Beschreibung des Russischen Reichs, a six volume edition of the geography and natural history of the Russian Empire, was published in Königsberg, Germany, from 1797 to 1802.

Georgi also translated many works of Linnaeus.

== Literature ==
- Vera Shirokova, Alexey Sobisevich, 'Illustrations from Academic Expeditions in Russia: The works of Falck and Georgi', iLINNAEUS | iMagazine | iStories (December 2015) https://www.ikfoundation.org/ilinnaeus/istories/verashirokova.php

== See also ==
- Category:Taxa named by Johann Gottlieb Georgi

== Sources ==
- "Георги, Иоганн-Готлиб" . Brockhaus and Efron Encyclopedic Dictionary (in Russian). 1906.
