= Hugo Zapałowicz =

- Born: 15 November 1852; Laibach, Austrian Empire
- Died: 20 November 1917 (aged 65); Perovsk [now Kyzylorda], Russian Empire (Modern day Kazakhstan
- Scientific career
- Fields: Botany

Hugo Zapałowicz (15 November 1852, in Ljubljana – 20 November 1917, in Perovsk [now Kyzylorda], Kazakhstan) was a botanist, natural scientist, traveller, and military lawyer.

Zapałowicz was a pioneer researcher of flora and geological structure of the Carpathian Mountains. He was also a geological, geographical, and flora researcher of South America and author of works about flora of Babia Góra-Babia Hora, Maramureş Mountains, Pokuttya.

In 1894 he became a member of the Academy of Learning.
