= Mannan endo-1,4-β-mannosidase =

Identifiers
- EC no.: 3.2.1.78
- CAS no.: 37288-54-3

Databases
- IntEnz: IntEnz view
- BRENDA: BRENDA entry
- ExPASy: NiceZyme view
- KEGG: KEGG entry
- MetaCyc: metabolic pathway
- PRIAM: profile
- PDB structures: RCSB PDB PDBe PDBsum
Search
- PMC: articles
- PubMed: articles
- NCBI: proteins

Mannan endo-1,4-β-mannosidase (EC 3.2.1.78, endo-1,4-β-mannanase, endo-β-1,4-mannase, β-mannanase B, β-1, 4-mannan 4-mannanohydrolase, endo-β-mannanase, β-D-mannanase, 1,4-β-D-mannan mannanohydrolase) is an enzyme with systematic name 4-β-D-mannan mannanohydrolase. It catalyses the hydrolysis of (1→4)-β-D-mannosidic linkages in mannans, galactomannans and glucomannans. The cleavage occurs at random internal sites within the chain, as denoted by the prefix "endo".
