= 4-O-beta-D-mannosyl-D-glucose phosphorylase =

Class of enzymes

Identifiers
- EC no.: 2.4.1.281

Databases
- IntEnz: IntEnz view
- BRENDA: BRENDA entry
- ExPASy: NiceZyme view
- KEGG: KEGG entry
- MetaCyc: metabolic pathway
- PRIAM: profile
- PDB structures: RCSB PDB PDBe PDBsum
Search
- PMC: articles
- PubMed: articles
- NCBI: proteins

4-O-beta-D-mannosyl-D-glucose phosphorylase (EC 2.4.1.281, mannosylglucose phosphorylase) is an enzyme with systematic name 4-O-beta-D-mannopyranosyl-D-glucopyranose:phosphate alpha-D-mannosyltransferase. This enzyme catalyses the following chemical reaction

4-O-β-D-mannopyranosyl-D-glucopyranose
P_{i}
D-glucose
+
α-D-mannose 1-phosphate

This enzyme forms part of a mannan catabolic pathway in the anaerobic bacterium Bacteroides fragilis NCTC 9343.
