= Mannan endo-1,6-alpha-mannosidase =

Enzyme that hydrolyzes α-D-mannosidic linkages in mannans

Mannan endo-1,6-α-mannosidase

Identifiers
- EC no.: 3.2.1.101
- CAS no.: 58500-56-4

Databases
- IntEnz: IntEnz view
- BRENDA: BRENDA entry
- ExPASy: NiceZyme view
- KEGG: KEGG entry
- MetaCyc: metabolic pathway
- PRIAM: profile
- PDB structures: RCSB PDB PDBe PDBsum
Search
- PMC: articles
- PubMed: articles
- NCBI: proteins

Mannan endo-1,6-α-mannosidase (EC 3.2.1.101, exo-1,6-β-mannanase, endo-α-1→6-D-mannanase, endo-1,6-β-mannanase, mannan endo-1,6-β-mannosidase, 1,6-α-D-mannan mannanohydrolase) is an enzyme with systematic name 6-α-D-mannan mannanohydrolase. It catalyses the random hydrolysis of (1→6)-α-D-mannosidic linkages in unbranched (1→6)-mannans
