= Mannan exo-1,2-1,6-alpha-mannosidase =

Identifiers
- EC no.: 3.2.1.137
- CAS no.: 123175-72-4

Databases
- IntEnz: IntEnz view
- BRENDA: BRENDA entry
- ExPASy: NiceZyme view
- KEGG: KEGG entry
- MetaCyc: metabolic pathway
- PRIAM: profile
- PDB structures: RCSB PDB PDBe PDBsum
Search
- PMC: articles
- PubMed: articles
- NCBI: proteins

Mannan exo-1,2-1,6-alpha-mannosidase (EC 3.2.1.137, exo-1,2-1,6-alpha-mannosidase, 1,2-1,6-alpha-D-mannan D-mannohydrolase) is an enzyme with systematic name (1->2)-(1->6)-alpha-D-mannan D-mannohydrolase. This enzyme catalyses the following chemical reaction

Hydrolysis of (1->2)-alpha-D- and (1->6)-alpha-D- linkages in yeast mannan, releasing D-mannose

Mannose residues alpha-D-1,3- bonded are released to lesser extent.
