= Mannan 1,2-(1,3)-α-mannosidase =

Class of enzymes

Identifiers
- EC no.: 3.2.1.77
- CAS no.: 37288-53-2

Databases
- IntEnz: IntEnz view
- BRENDA: BRENDA entry
- ExPASy: NiceZyme view
- KEGG: KEGG entry
- MetaCyc: metabolic pathway
- PRIAM: profile
- PDB structures: RCSB PDB PDBe PDBsum
Search
- PMC: articles
- PubMed: articles
- NCBI: proteins

Mannan 1,2-(1,3)-α-mannosidase (EC 3.2.1.77, exo-1,2-1,3-α-mannosidase, 1,2-1,3-α-D-mannan mannohydrolase) is an enzyme with systematic name (1→2)-(1→3)-α-D-mannan mannohydrolase. It catalyses the hydrolysis of (1→2)- and (1→3)-linkages in yeast mannan, releasing mannose.

A 1,6-α-D-mannan backbone remains after action on yeast mannan.
