= Macronutrient preload =

Dieting technique

Macronutrient preload is a dieting technique in which a small amount of macronutrients are eaten at a fixed interval before a meal.

Fibers in a preload stimulate a feeling of fullness in the stomach. The glucomannan fiber preload is approved for weight control by European Food Safety Authority The preload should also have a low glycemic index and contain few calories.
