= Alfa mannan degradation =

The α-mannan degradation Mannan which can be found in the cell wall of yeast has a particular chemical structure, and constitutes a food source since humans begun eating fermented foods several thousands of years ago. To determine whether the intake of yeast mannans through fermented foods has promoted specific adaptations of the human gut microbiota, an international team of researchers studied the ability of Bacteroides thetaiotaomicron to specifically degrade yeast mannans.

The mannan-oligosaccharides are able to alter the composition of the microbiota present in the bowels, so they produce an increase in the growth of benign bacteria and therefore an increase in the resistance to infection by pathogens.

The B. thetaiotaomicron are bacteria that have been shown to bind polysaccharides thanks to a receptor system located on the outer membrane before introducing the polysaccharides into the periplasm for their degradation to monosaccharides. These bacteria use α-mannose as a carbon source. Transcriptional studies have identified three different PULs (Polysaccharide Utilization Loci) which are activated by α-mannan from Saccharomyces cerevisiae, and Schizosaccharomyces pombe and the yeast pathogen Candida albicans. To demonstrate the specificity of these PULs, the researchers have engineered different B. thetaiotaomicron strains which showed that mutants lacking MAN-PUL1, MAN-PUL3 or PUL2 are unable to grow in vitro with yeast mannan as the sole carbon source.

In order to assess whether the ability to degrade yeast mannan is a general feature of the microbiota or it is a specific adaptation of B. thetaiotaomicron, the authors analysed the growth profiles of 29 species of Bacteroidota on the human bowel. The analysis revealed that only nine are able to metabolize S. cerevisiae alfa-mannan while 33 of 34 strains of B. thetaiotaomicron are able to grow on this glycan. These results show that B. thetaiotaomicron along with some phylogenetically related species dominate the yeast metabolism of α-mannan in the phylum Bacteroidota of the microbial flora.
