= Momigami =

Japanese papermaking method

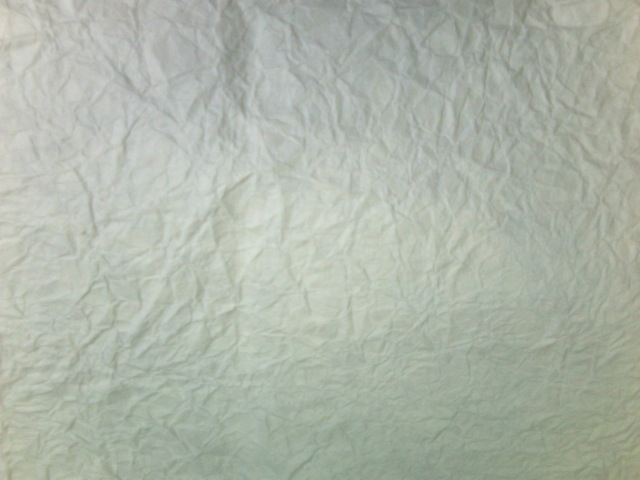
Sample of momigami made by papermaker Gina Page

Momigami (揉み紙) is the paper made from a traditional Japanese papermaking method often described as kneaded paper.

Konnyaku (こんにゃく) starch is used to strengthen kōzo (楮) (mulberry paper), which acquires an appearance of leather, then the paper is crumpled to achieve a high degree of flexibility. Momigami has been used to make inexpensive clothing for almost a millennium.

Japanese artist Sadao Watanabe has made prints of Biblical themes on momigami paper.
