= MannanLife =

Japanese food company

- Industry: food processing
- Founded: September 1964
- Headquarters: Tomioka, Gunma, Japan
- Products: Konnyaku jelly
- Number of employees: 144 (as of 1 April 2020)
- Website: http://www.mannanlife.co.jp/

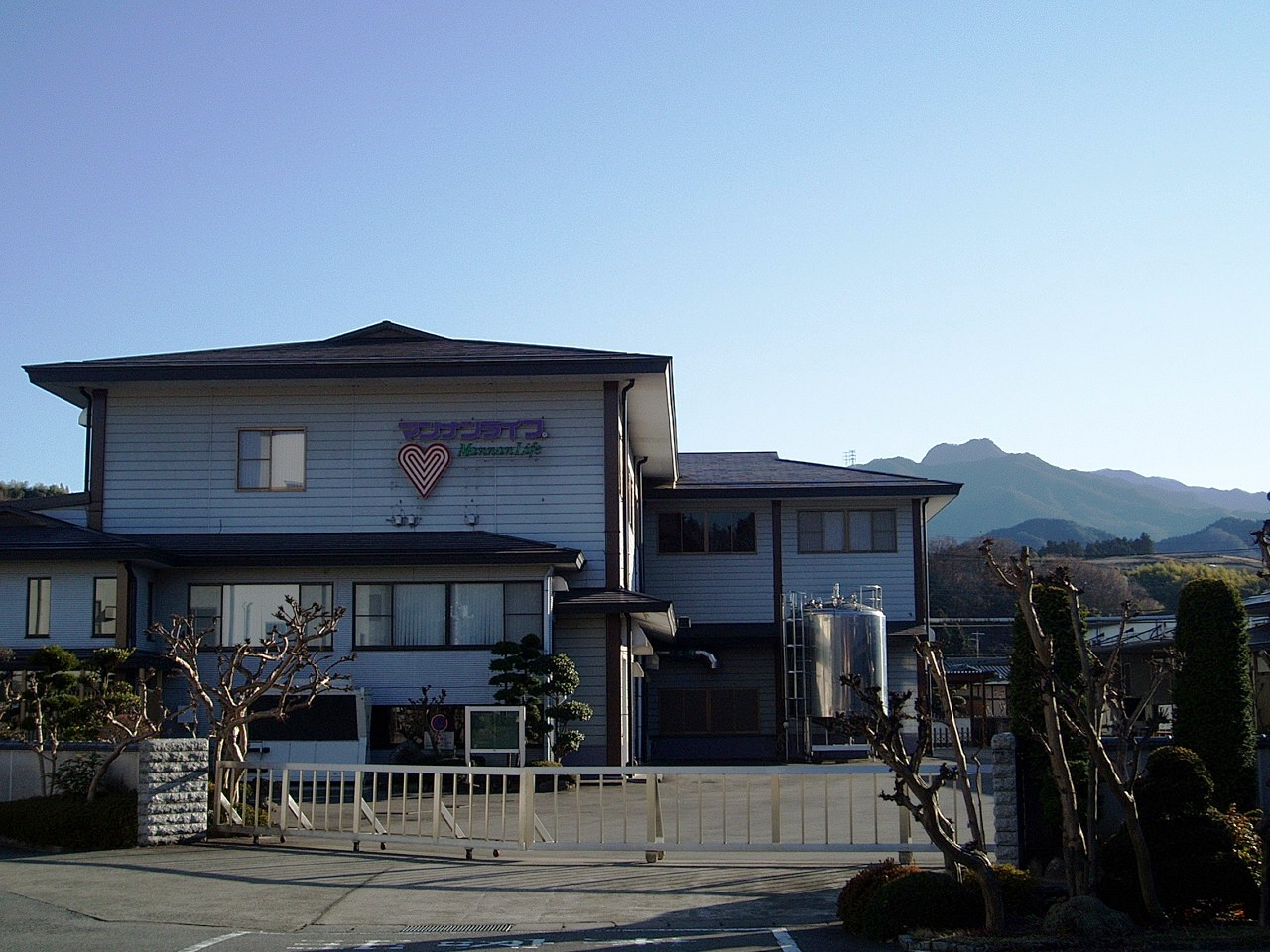
Headquarters of MannanLife in Tomioka

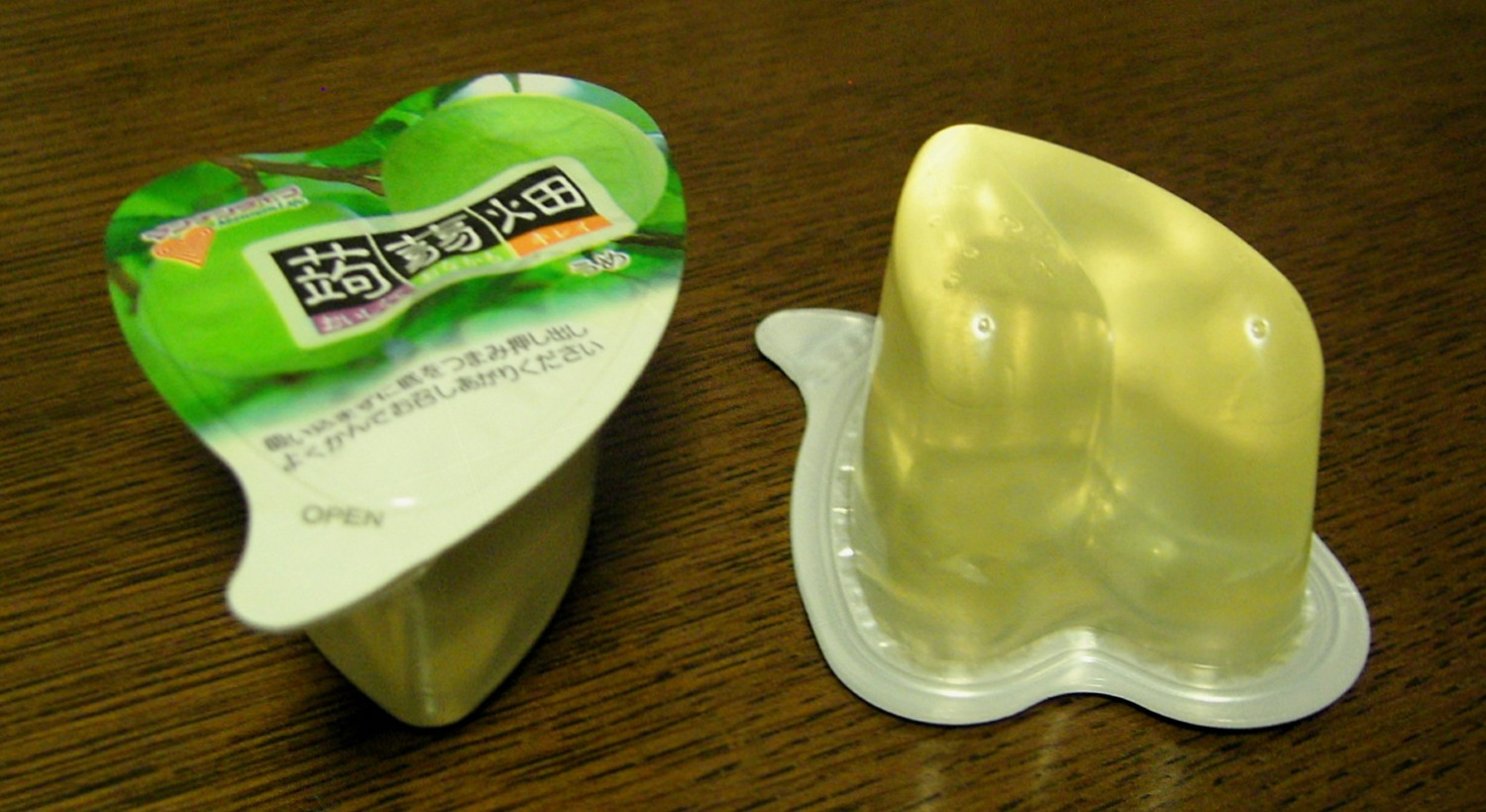
Ume-flavoured "Konnyaku Batake" made by MannanLife

MannanLife Co., Ltd. (株式会社マンナンライフ, Kabushiki Gaisha Mannan Raifu) is a Japanese company that sells "Konnyaku Batake" fruit-flavoured konnyaku jelly. MannanLife holds a 60 to 70 percent share of the konnyaku jelly market in Japan.

Sales of "Konnyaku Batake" were suspended from 8 October 2008 after it was reported that 17 children and elderly people in Japan had choked to death on konnyaku jelly since 1995. In 2009 they released the product Lala Crush.
