= Shirataki noodles =

Type of Japanese noodles made from konjac

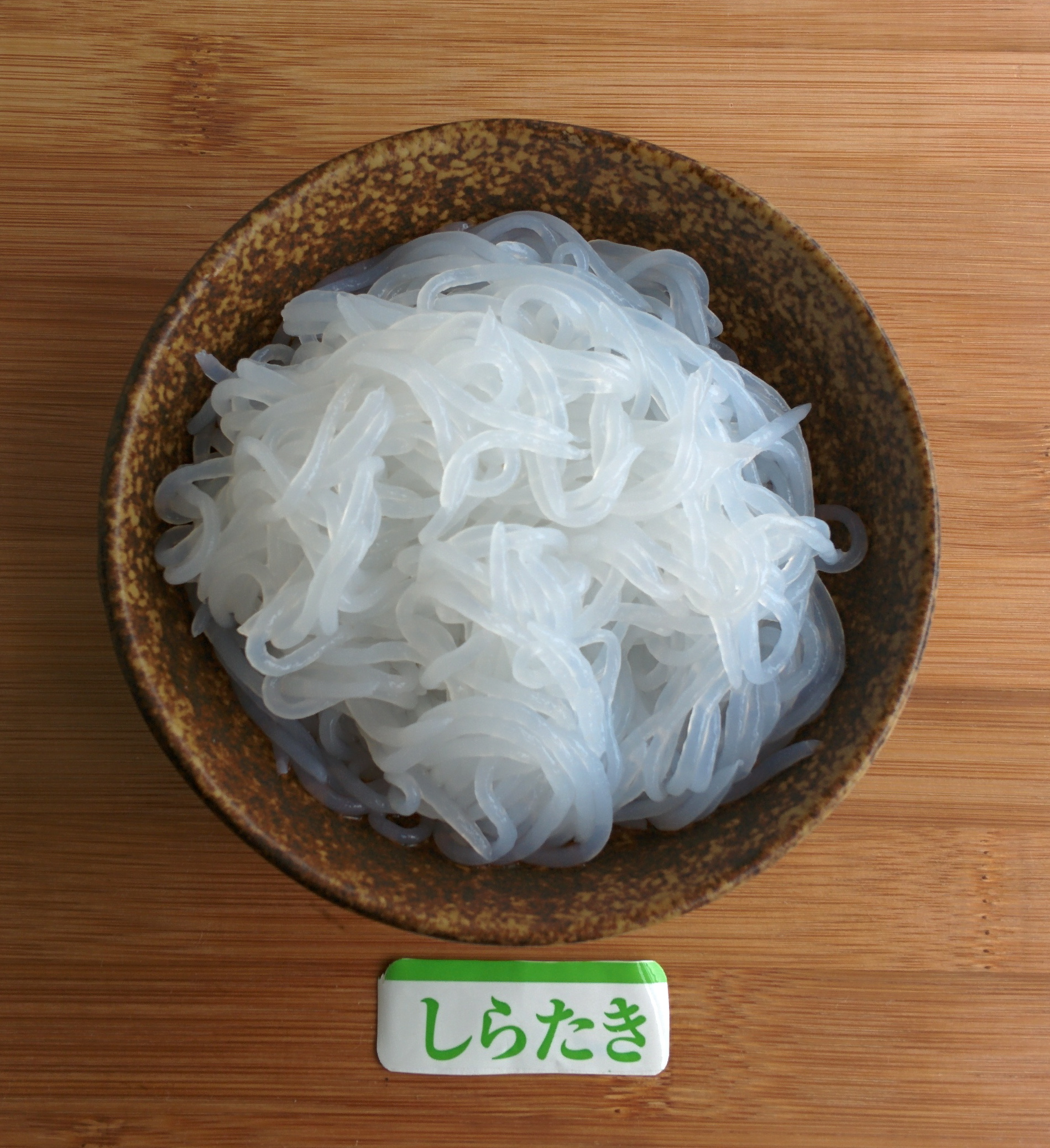
- Shirataki noodles, made of konjac
- Type: Japanese noodles
- Place of origin: Japan
- Main ingredients: Konjac

Shirataki (Japanese: 白滝, often written with the hiragana しらたき) are translucent, gelatinous Japanese noodles made from the corm of the konjac plant. In traditional Japanese cuisine, they are eaten in soups or stir-fried. The texture is chewy, similar to a tough jelly, and has little flavor before seasoning.

Compared to noodles made from wheat or rice, shirataki is very low in calories, and are sometimes eaten by those on a diet. They are also valuable to people with allergies or intolerances to wheat, gluten or eggs. Shirataki is often sold in containers with alkaline water, and needs to be rinsed before cooking to remove the bitter flavor.

== Names and forms ==
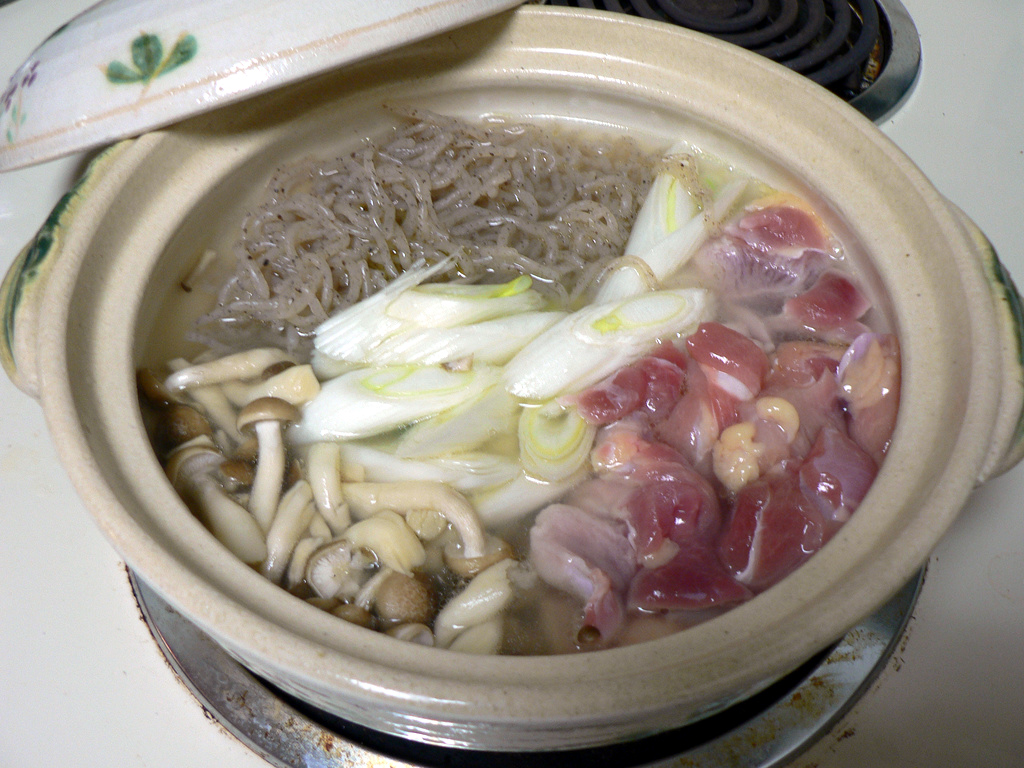
Shirataki noodles (top) and other ingredients in a donabe

The word shirataki means "white waterfall", referring to the white appearance of the noodles.

Shirataki is also called yam noodles or devil's tongue noodles, referring to the English names of the konjac plant. One variation is ito-konnyaku (糸こんにゃく, "konjac strings"), which are generally thicker, darker, with a square cross section. It is preferred in the Kansai region.

== Composition ==
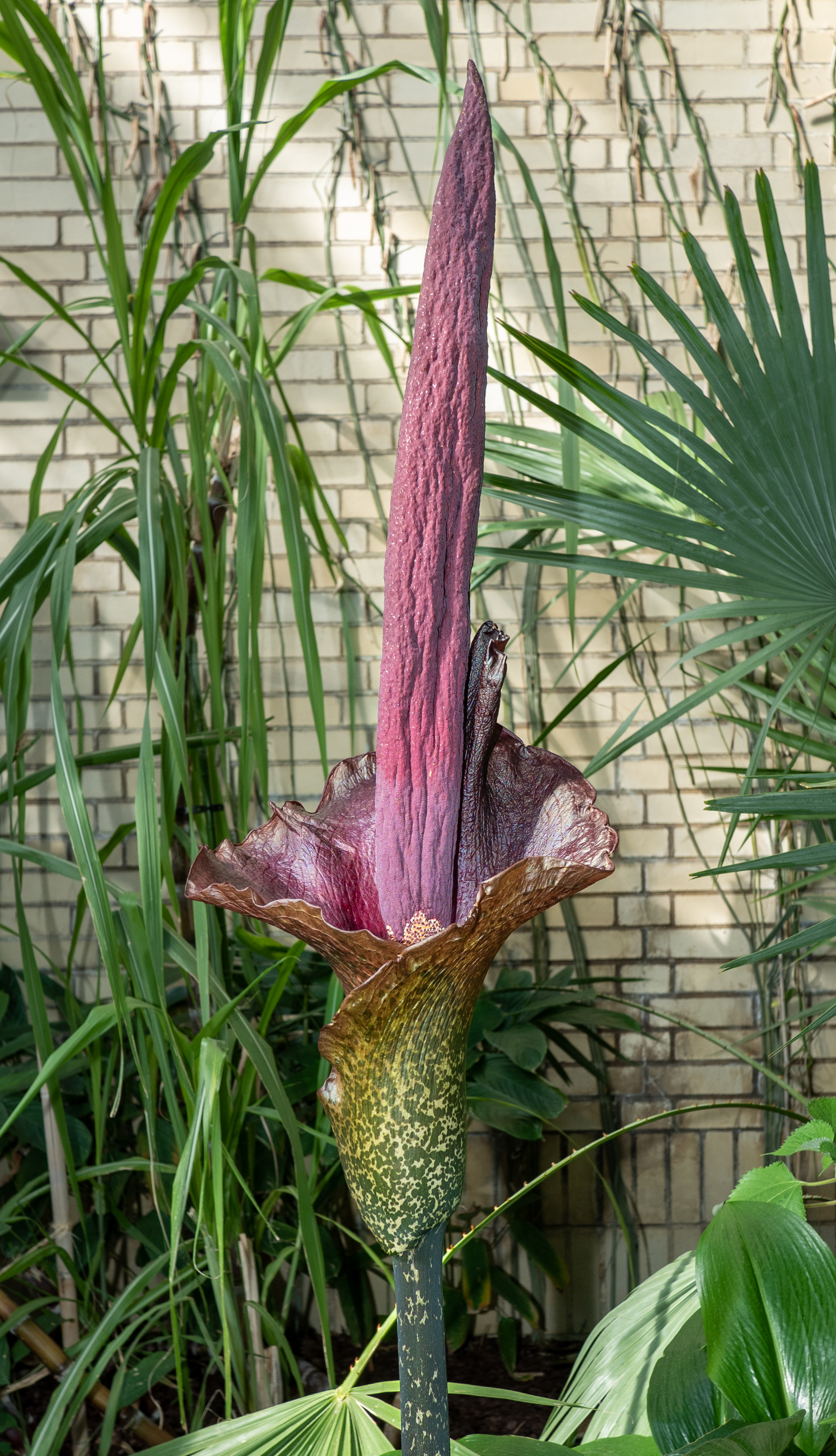
Shirataki is made from the corm of the konjac plant

The konjac yam, whose corm (a thick underground stem) yields the yam-cake (konnyaku) from which the noodles are made, is also called devil's tongue yam or elephant yam. Shirataki noodles are made from 97% water and 3% konjac, which contains glucomannan, a water-soluble dietary fiber. They are very low in digestible carbohydrates and food energy, and have little flavor of their own.

== Manufacture ==
There used to be a difference in manufacturing methods. Producers in the Kansai region of Japan prepared shirataki (called ito konnyaku there) by cutting konnyaku jelly into threads, while producers in the Kantō region made the noodles by pushing konnyaku through small holes into a hot, concentrated lime solution. Modern producers make both types using the latter method.

== Culinary use ==
Shirataki noodles come in dry and soft "wet" forms in Asian markets and some supermarkets. When purchased wet, they are packaged in liquid. Some brands require rinsing and sautéing or parboiling, as the alkaline water in the packaging has an odor some find unpleasant. They normally have a shelf life of up to one year.

The noodles can also be drained and dry-roasted, which diminishes bitterness and gives the noodles a more pasta-like consistency. Dry-roasted noodles can be served in soup stock, sauce, or noodle soup. It can also be stir-fried.

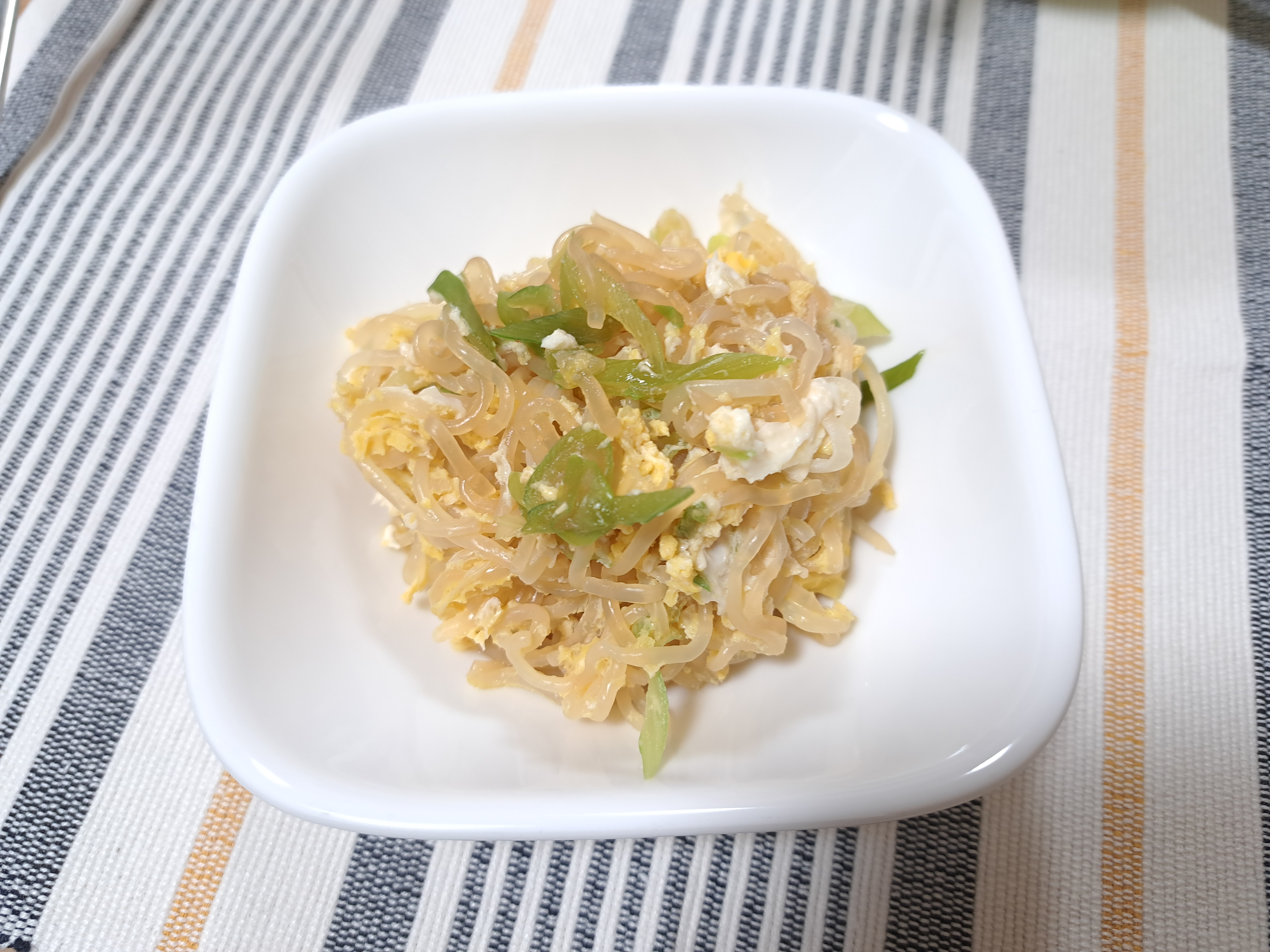

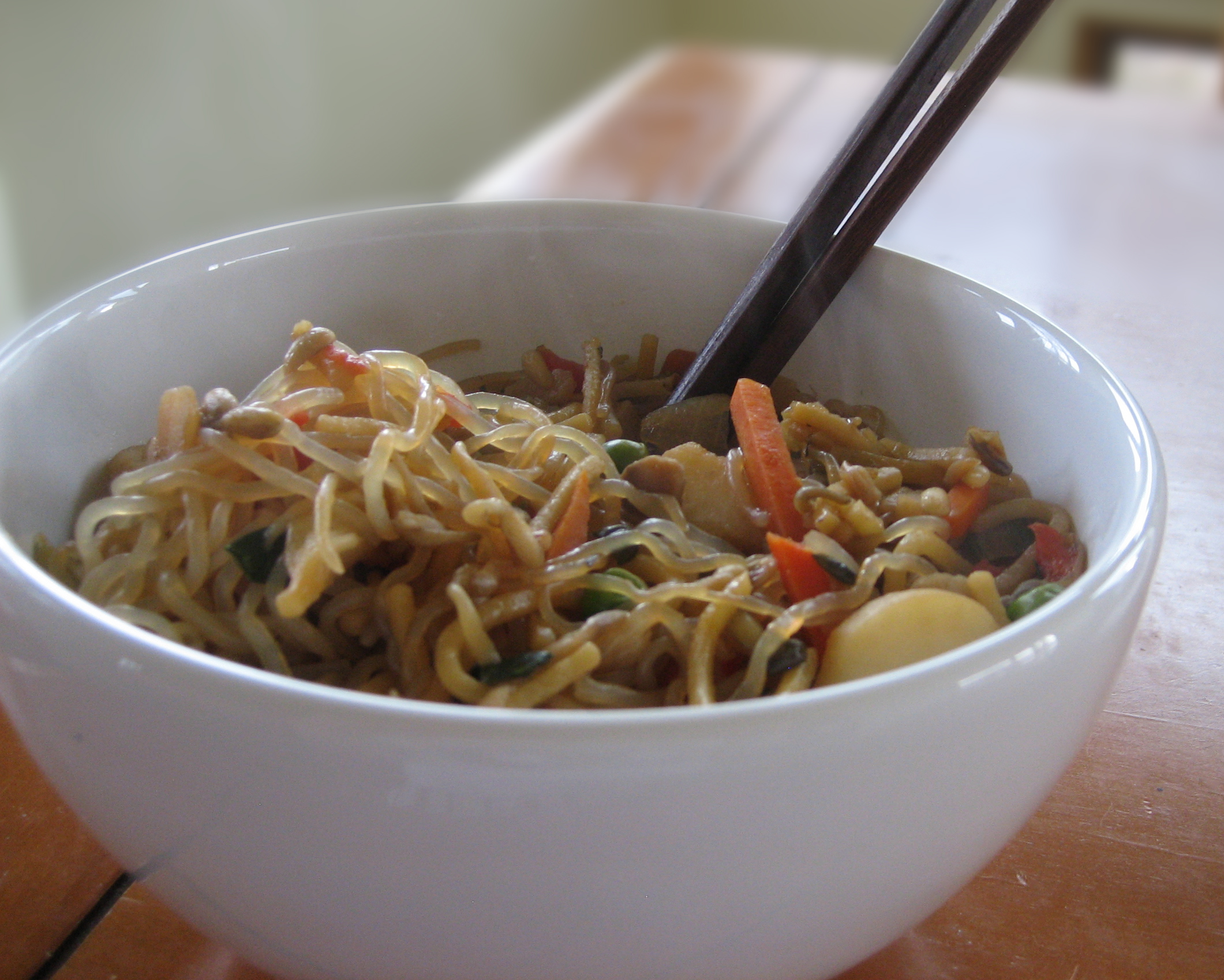

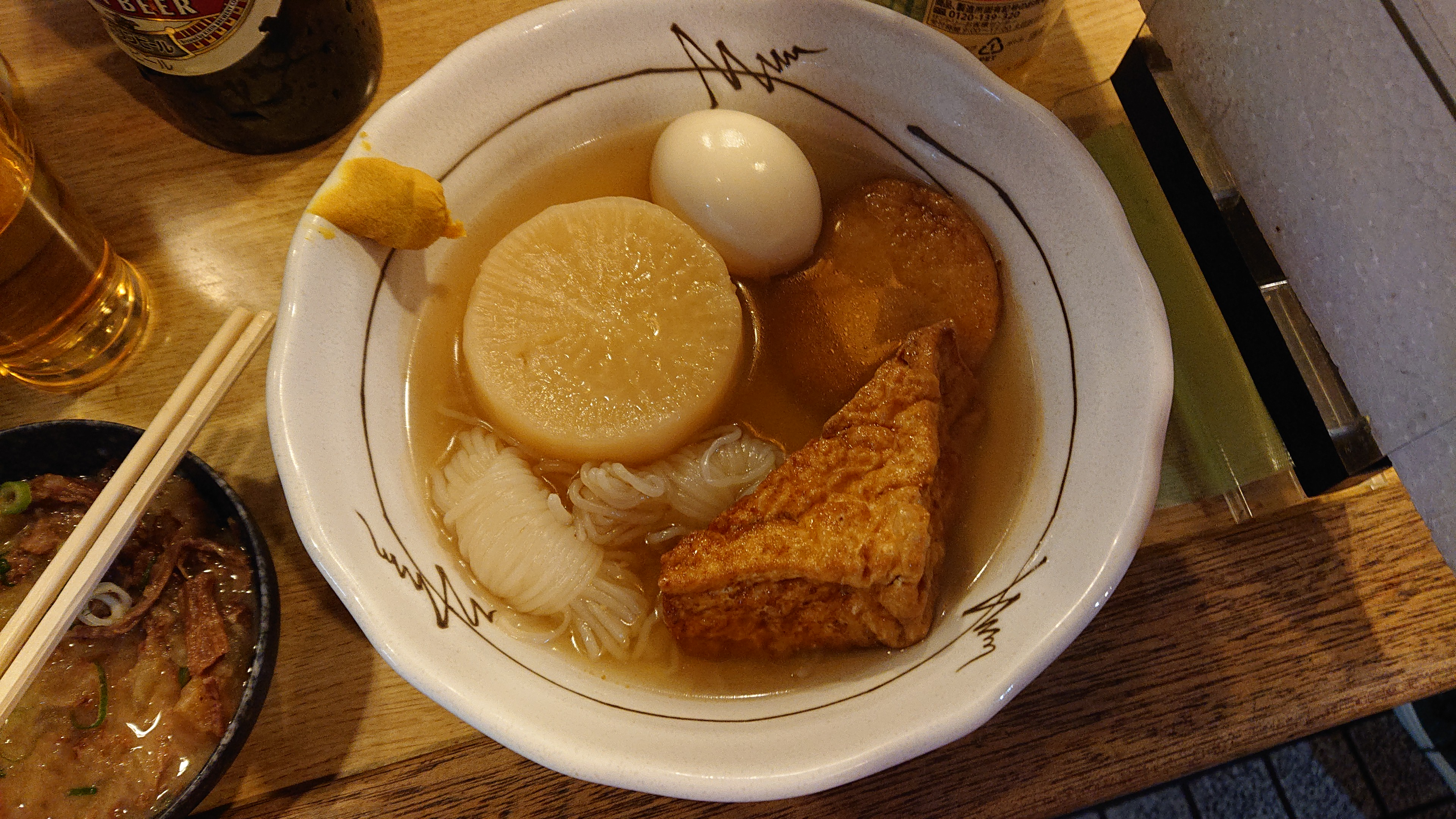
Oden with shirataki noodles

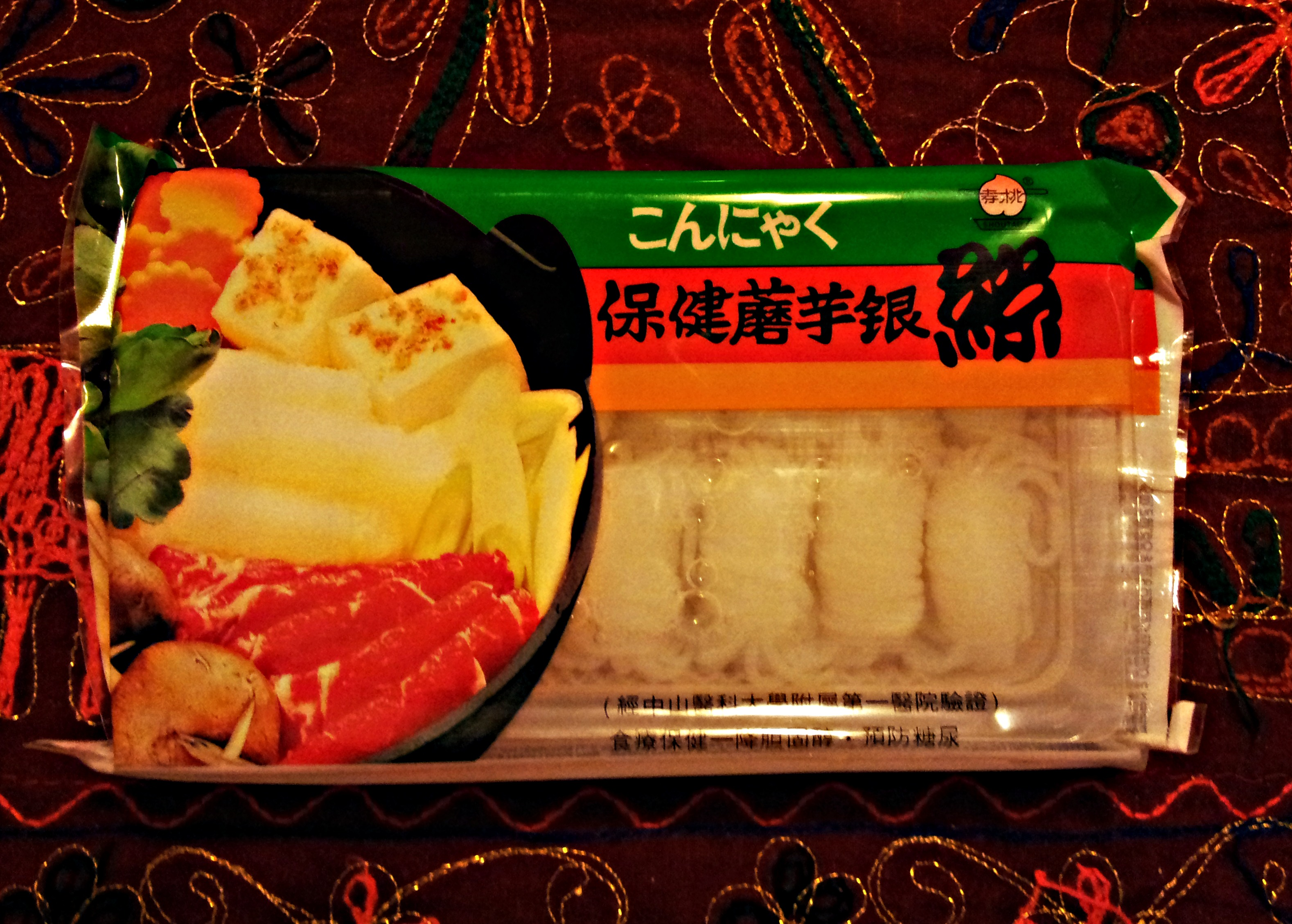
Packed in alkaline liquid
