= Sadao Watanabe (artist) =

Japanese printmaker

Sadao Watanabe (渡辺 禎雄, Watanabe Sadao; July 7, 1913 – January 8, 1996), born and raised in Tokyo, was a Japanese printmaker. Watanabe was famous for his biblical prints rendered in the mingei (folk art) tradition of Japan. As a student of the master textile dye artist Serizawa Keisuke (1895–1984), Watanabe was associated with the mingei (folk art) movement.

== Early life ==
Watanabe's father died when he was ten years old. He dropped out of school at an early age and became an apprentice in a dyer's shop. A Christian woman in his neighborhood invited the fatherless boy to attend church with her. At the age of seventeen, Watanabe received baptism.

== The path towards printmaking ==
The young Watanabe worked in dyers' shops, sketching patterns and dyeing clothes. In 1937, one year after Yanagi Sōetsu (1889–1961), father of the Japanese mingei (folk art) movement, had established the Folk Art Museum, the 24-year-old Watanabe saw an exhibition of Serizawa Keisuke's (1895–1984) work. The event sowed the seeds of Watanabe's artistic endeavor. A few years later, Watanabe attended a study group in which Serizawa taught his katazome technique of stencilling and dyeing, which originated in Okinawa. From then on, the teacher-and-student relationship between Serizawa and Watanabe became strong and abiding.

== Subject matter and technique ==
The subject matter of Watanabe's prints is exclusively the gospel rendered in the mingei (folk art) approach. Influenced by Buddhist figure prints, Watanabe placed biblical subjects in a Japanese context. In The Last Supper (1981) Watanabe depicts the disciples in kimono. On the table are bottles of sake and sushi.

In Kiku ("Listening", 1960), which recalls medieval iconography, Watanabe depicted a solitary devout figure listening to the voice of heaven; the red background was applied first, the white, green and yellow pigments were brushed on freehand, and the black outlines were added last, using a stencil. In Nozomu (1961), two figures kneel in prayer against an intense lemon-green background whose crumpled momigami texture adds vibrancy to the composition

Watanabe uses kozo paper (from mulberry tree) and momigami (kneaded paper). The momigami paper was crumpled by hand, squeezed and wrinkled to give a rough quality to the prints. The katazome method uses traditional organic and mineral pigments in a medium of soybean milk. The protein in the milk bound the colors to the paper's surface. The use of natural materials is one of the characteristics of mingei (folk art).

Watanabe would first draw a design on tracing paper, then cut a stencil from hardened paper with a knife. Placing the stencil on a light box, he positioned the print sheet on top and painted the areas he wished to colour within the outline of the design; the stencil was then laid over the coloured sheet and covered with a silk screen, and a wooden spatula was used to spread a resist paste over the coloured areas before the stencil was removed and the exposed outlines painted black. The paste was finally washed away in a water bath to reveal the colours bordered by black lines. Printmaking was a family undertaking for Watanabe: his wife Harue soaked and strained soybeans to make the milk used as a binder, mixed a paste of rice bran, lemon and salt to protect the coloured sections of each sheet, and, once the prints had dried, rinsed them and cleaned away the resist paste to reveal the finished image.

== International recognition ==
In 1958, Watanabe received first prize at the Modern Japanese Print Exhibition held in New York City for The Bronze Serpent showing Moses and the people of Israel. Watanabe's Kiku ("Listening") (1960) was featured in the novelist James Michener's The Modern Japanese Print (1962), a book that introduced ten sōsaku-hanga artists to the Western audience.

The Vatican Museum, the British Museum, the Museum of Modern Art in New York, the National Museum of Modern Art in Tokyo, Gallery 1252 in Klaipeda and many other leading museums in the world had exhibited Watanabe's works. During President Lyndon Johnson's administration, Watanabe's prints were hung in the White House.

== Later years ==
Watanabe spent his final years in a modest two-storey house on a quiet side street in the university district of Shimo-Ochiai, near Tokyo's busy Takadanobaba transit hub. Largely unnoticed among the commuters, he went to the train station every day to meet foreign visitors who had come to see his prints, believing that introducing them, along with students and millions of Japanese, to Christianity through woodblock printing was his life's mission. Watanabe's naive interpretations of biblical scenes have also been noted for their appeal among Jewish audiences, particularly for his treatment of Old Testament subjects.

== The artist's philosophy ==
Watanabe once remarked that he preferred that his prints hang in the ordinary places of life: "I would most like to see them [his prints] hanging where people ordinarily gather, because Jesus brought the gospel for the people".
