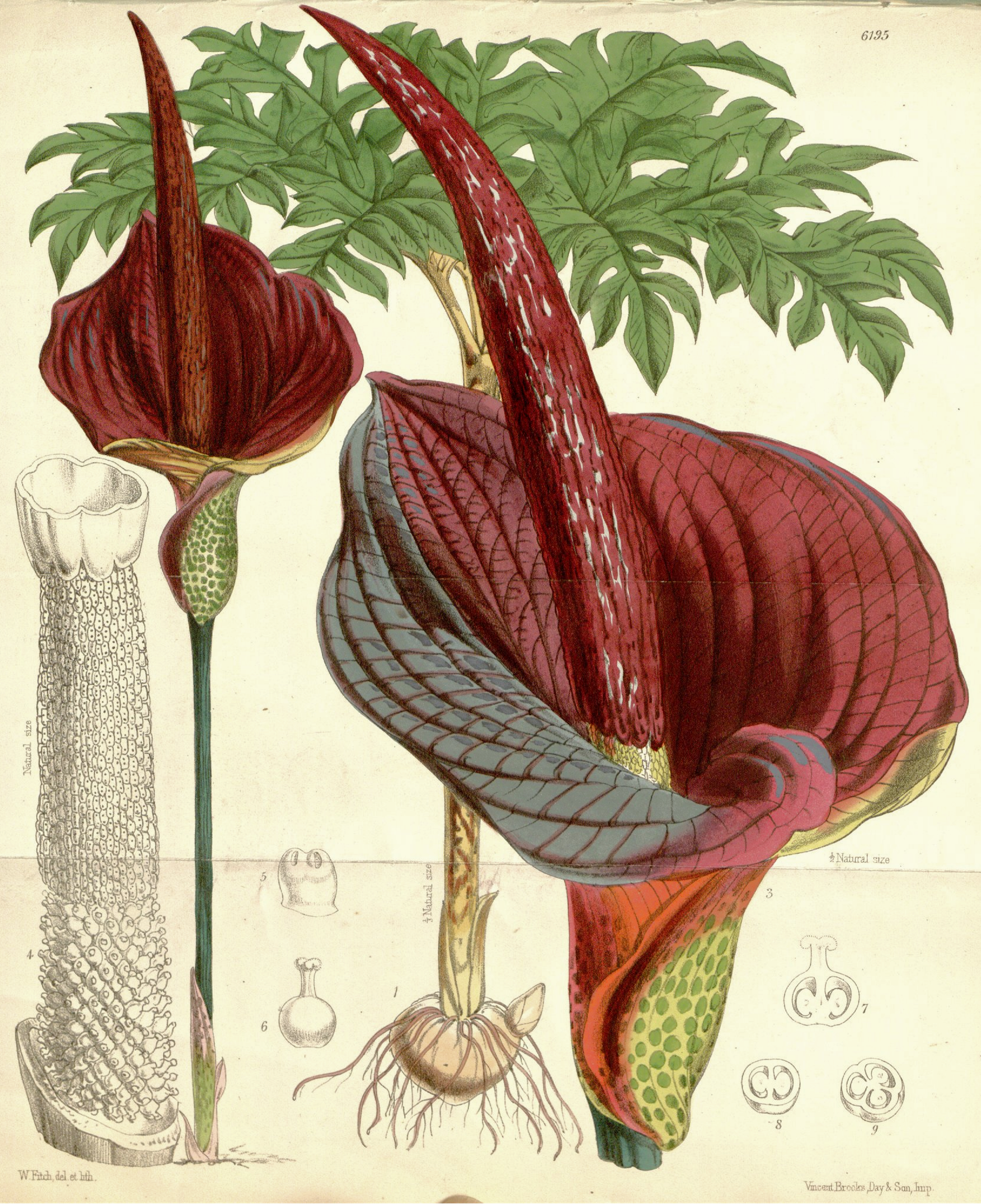

Scientific classification
- Kingdom: Plantae
- Clade: Embryophytes
- Clade: Tracheophytes
- Clade: Angiosperms
- Clade: Monocots
- Order: Alismatales
- Family: Araceae
- Genus: Amorphophallus
- Species: A. konjac

Binomial name
- Amorphophallus konjac K. Koch

Synonyms
- List: Amorphophallus rivierei var. konjac (K.Koch) Engl.; Brachyspatha konjac (K.Koch) K.Koch; Amorphophallus mairei H.Lév.; Amorphophallus nanus H.Li & C.L.Long; Amorphophallus palmiformis Durieu ex Rivière; Amorphophallus rivierei Durand ex Carrière; Conophallus konjak Schott; Conophallus konniaku Schott ex Fesca; Hydrosme rivierei (Durand ex Carrière) Engl.; Proteinophallus rivierei (Durand ex Carrière) Hook.f.; Tapeinophallus rivierei (Durand ex Carrière) Baill.

= Amorphophallus konjac =

Konjac Amorphophallus konjac

Edible plant from Yunnan, China

Amorphophallus konjac, commonly known as juruo (Chinese: 蒟蒻; pinyin: jǔruò), konnyaku (Note: Japanese: こんにゃく konnyaku reading of kanji 蒟蒻, 菎蒻; also: konjaku, konnyaku potato) or konjac, (Note: also: konjak, English: /ˈkɒnjæk, ˈkɒndʒæk/ KON-yak, KON-jak) or moyu (Chinese: 魔芋; pinyin: móyù (Note: lit. 'demon taro')), is a species of flowering plant in the family Araceae. In English, it is also referred to as devil's tongue, voodoo lily, snake palm, or elephant yam. (Note: This name is also used for A. paeoniifolius.)

Native to China and cultivated in East and Southeast Asia, the perennial species forms a corm, the stem of which produces a purplish flower. Food made from the corm (Note: The corm is often colloquially referred to as a yam, though it is not related to tubers of the family Dioscoreaceae.) is known as konnyaku in Japanese (Note: Japanese pronunciation: [koɲ.ɲaꜜ.kɯ, -ɲa.kɯꜜ]) – which can be made into white or black cake, as well as a kind of noodle called shirataki – or as the Chinese 魔芋 móyù, a term that also refers to the plant itself.

Moyu was first domesticated in Southwest China about 2000 years ago, where Yi people and other early cultivators developed methods to detoxify the naturally irritating corm through repeated boiling and the use of alkaline ash water. These techniques enabled the plant to transition from a toxic wild tuber to a fiber-rich food source, and they form the basis of the traditional processing methods still used in parts of China today.

== Description ==
It is a perennial plant, growing from a large corm up to 25 cm (10 in) in diameter. The single leaf is up to 1.3 m (4 ft) across, bipinnate, and divided into numerous leaflets. The flowers are produced on a spathe enclosed by a dark purple spadix up to 55 cm (22 in) long.

It is a relative of the titan arum (A. titanum), one of the largest flowering plants in the world and a congener of moyu.

All parts of the moyu plant are toxic, with the corm being the most poisonous. It cannot be eaten raw and must be processed before consumption. Poisoning can cause burning, itching pain, and swelling of the tongue and throat if digested.

== Distribution and habitat ==
Wild forms grow naturally in China (Yunnan in the southwest) and Southeast Asia.

== Uses ==
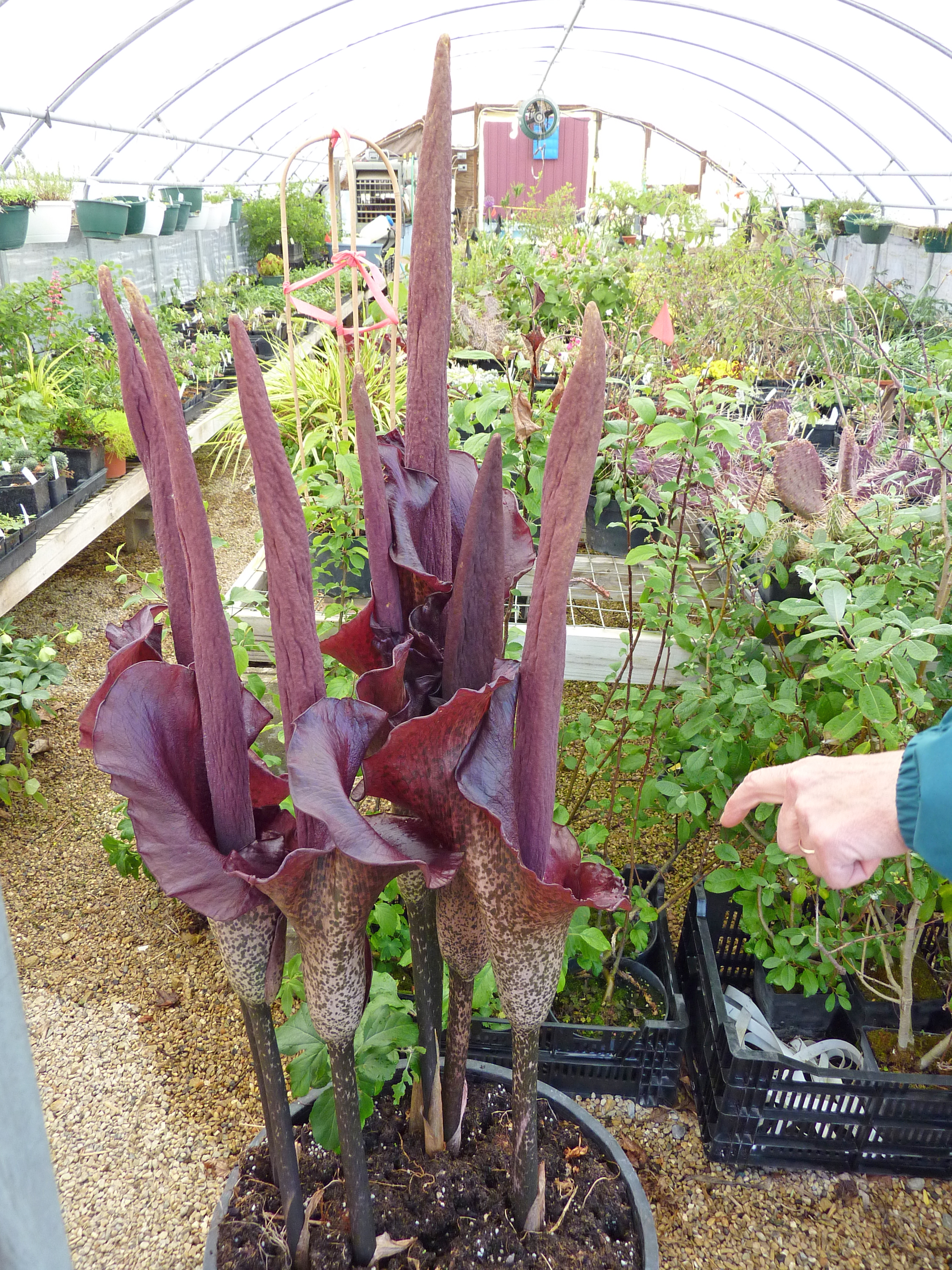
Amorphophallus konjac in bloom

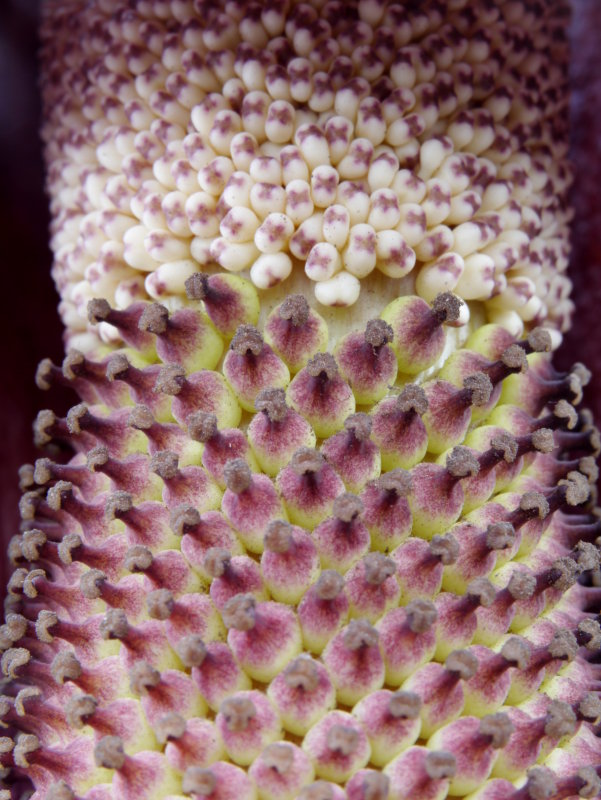
Amorphophallus konjac male (top) and female (bottom) flowers

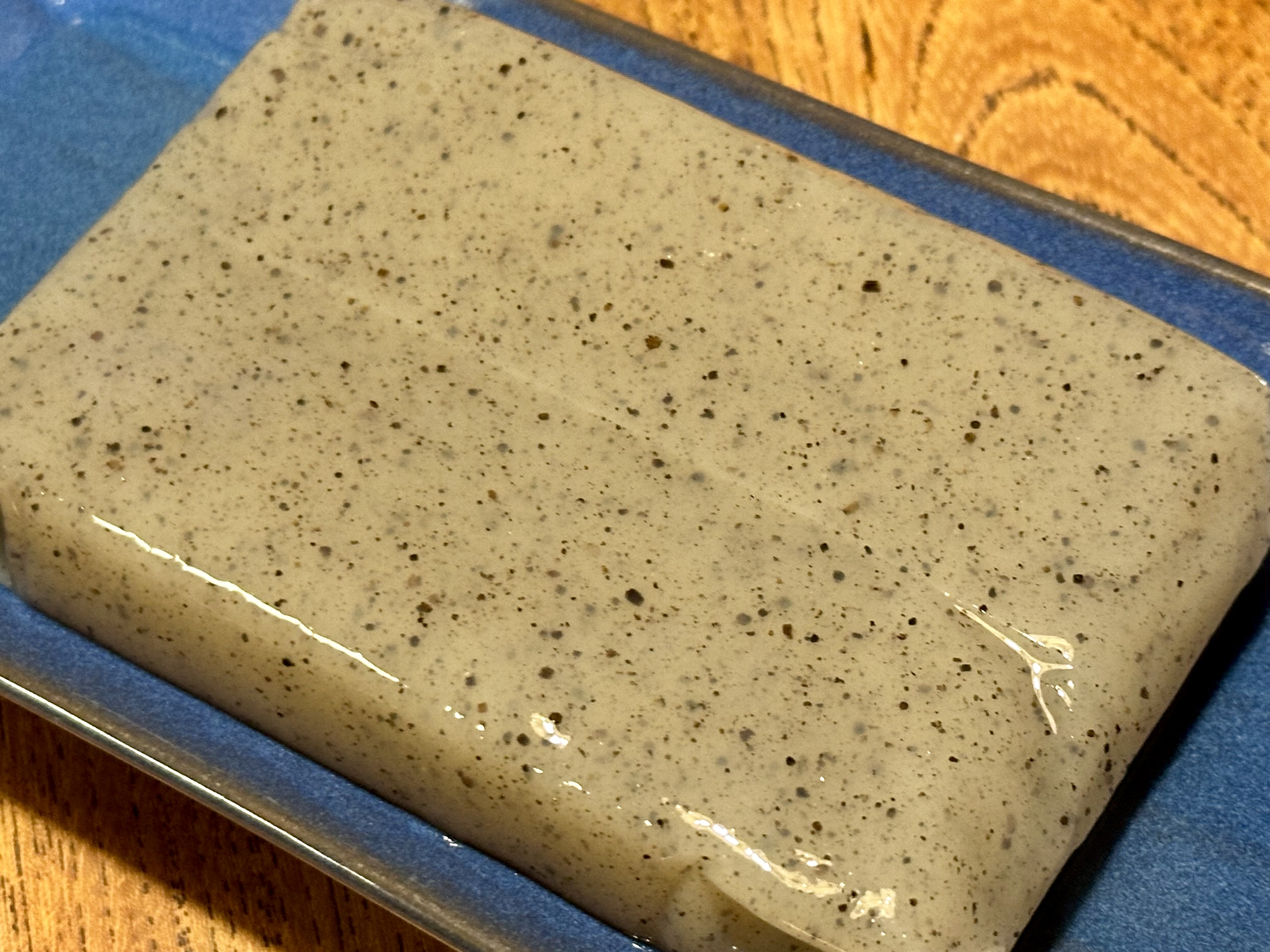
Japanese konjac gel, with hijiki seaweed mixed in

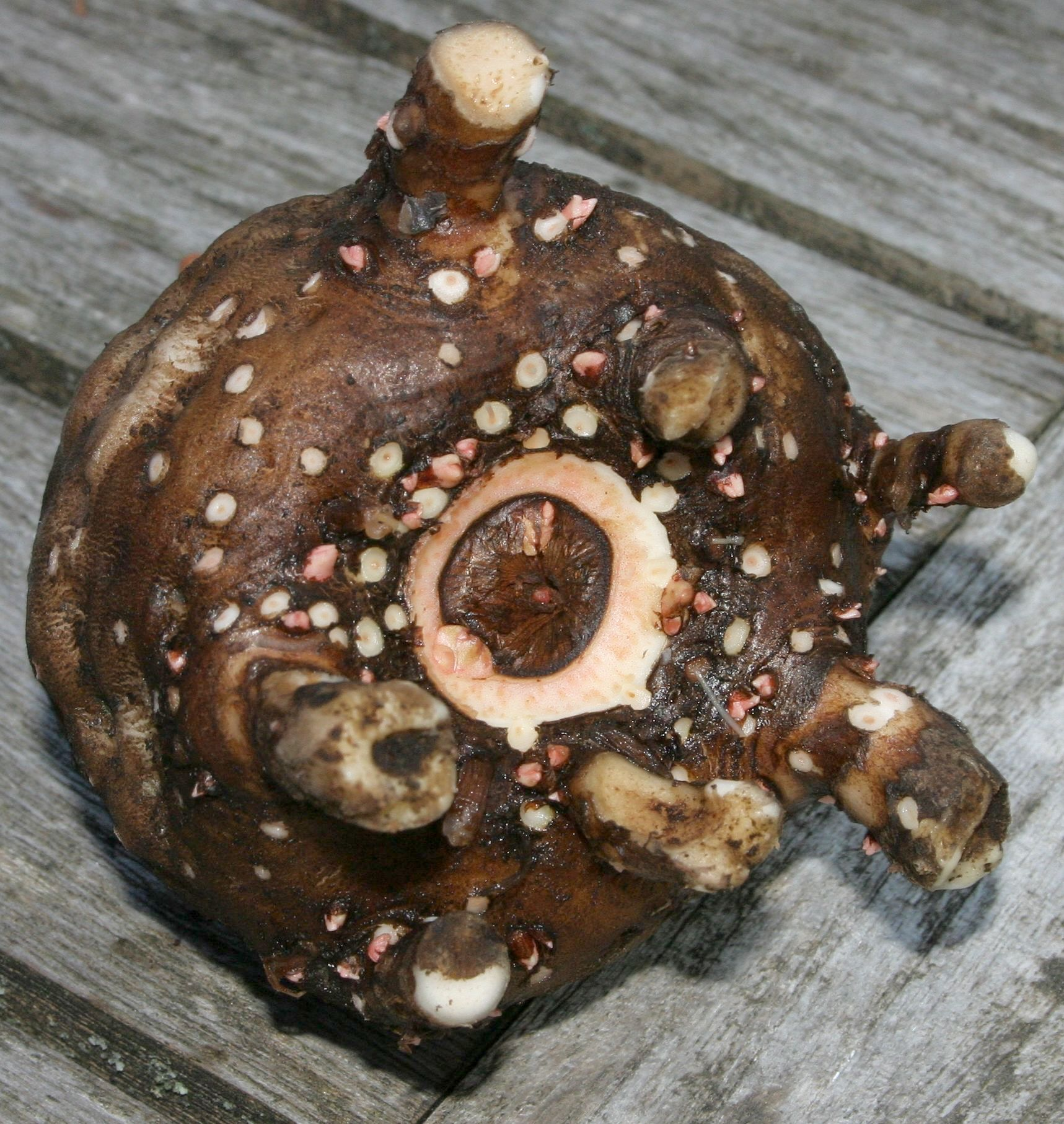
Konjac corm used for preparing food

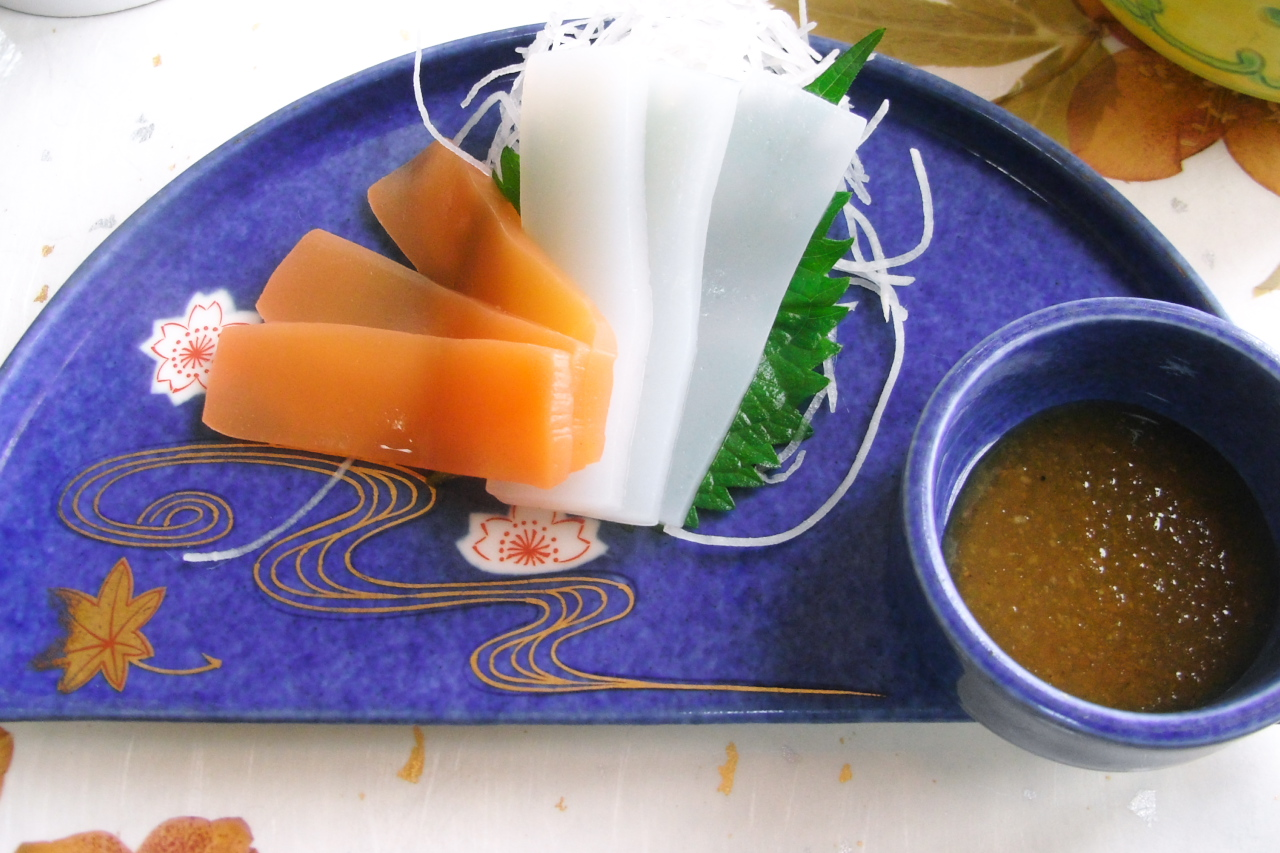
Sashimi konnyaku, usually served with a miso-based dipping sauce rather than soy sauce

Moyu (konjac) is grown in warm subtropical to tropical areas of East and Southeast Asia, from China and Japan south to Indonesia and Vietnam (USDA hardiness zone 6–11). and it is prized for its large starchy corms, used to create a flour and jelly of the same name. It is also used as a vegan substitute for gelatin.

=== China ===
Native to China, moyu has been used for more 2000 years. Early medicinal references to the plant appear in Shennong Bencaojing (Chinese: 神农本草经, lit. 'Shen-nong's Herbal Classics'), a foundational herbal materia medica traditionally associated with the Western Han dynasty (206 BC – 8 AD), describing the corm as a medicinal substance valued for its detoxifying and expectorant properties. The original text of the Shennong Bencaojing is lost, and the version that survives today was restored and recompiled from quotations in later dynasties. The plant was later introduced to Japan, where it has been consumed since at least the 6th century.

The earliest clear record of its cultivation and food use comes from the Western Jin dynasty (265–317 AD). In "Ode to the Capital of Shu" (蜀都赋, part of Three Capitals Rhapsody), the poet Zuo Si (左思) mentions "juruo" (蒟蒻) growing in the gardens of the Shu region (present-day Sichuan). Later Tang-dynasty annotations provide a detailed description, in which the large white corm is boiled with alkaline ash water (lye, 灰汁) to neutralize its toxicity and form a firm jelly-like substance, which locals prized and sometimes preserved in vinegar. The viscous jelly derived from the dried corm contains a high proportion of glucomannan gum.

Moyu is commonly consumed in the Chinese provinces of Sichuan, Chongqing, Guizhou, and Yunnan. The corm is known as móyù (Chinese: 魔芋; lit. 'demonic taro', 'magical taro'), while the jelly made from it is called móyù dòufu (魔芋豆腐; lit. 'moyu tofu'), “snow moyu” (xuě móyù, 雪魔芋), or simply móyù kuài (魔芋块; lit. 'moyu brick').

Because moyu jelly has a firm, elastic texture and readily absorbs the flavors of broths and seasonings, it is recently marketed as a plant‑based analogue of beef tripe, known as sù máodǔ (素毛肚; lit. 'vegetarian tripe'). Ridged or shredded forms of moyu mimic the chewiness of animal offal while remaining very low in calories and high in dietary fiber, making them common ingredients in hot pot dishes and Sichuan‑style preparations.

=== Japan ===
In Japanese cuisine, food product made from moyu plant, known as konnyaku, appears in dishes such as oden. It is typically mottled grey and firmer in consistency than most gelatins. It has very little flavor; the common variety tastes vaguely like salt, usually with a slightly oceanic taste and smell (from the seaweed powder added to it, though some forms omit the seaweed).

In Japan over 90% of all domestically produced moyu (konjac) is made in Gunma Prefecture. It is valued more for its texture than flavor. Ito konnyaku (糸蒟蒻) is a Japanese food consisting of konjac cut into noodle-like strips. It is usually sold in plastic bags with accompanying water, which is drained before cooking. The name literally means 'thread-konjac'.

Japanese konnyaku is made by mixing konjac flour with water and limewater. Konjac cannot be eaten raw because it contains oxalic acid. The product comes in various shades of gray; konnyaku made from corm are naturally dark, while those made from konjac flour are white. Hijiki is often added for the characteristic dark color and flavor. It is then boiled and cooled to solidify. Konjac made in noodle form is called shirataki and used in foods such as sukiyaki and gyūdon.

Konjac has been used in Japan since the 6th century, as a supposed medicinal food. Japanese documents from around the 18th century mentions its intestinal cleansing property. Nakajima Toemon developed a method to produce konjac flour in 1776, which are more durable for transportation and storage, contributing to their wider consumption.

=== Vietnam ===
In Vietnam, konjac is mainly grown in the An Giang province. The corms are collected and processed into flour. The flour is used to make drinks, cakes, and noodles.

=== Traditional medicine ===
The dried corm of the konjac plant contains around 40% glucomannan gum. This polysaccharide makes konjac jelly, a viscous substance that may be used in traditional Chinese medicine.

=== Fruit jelly ===
Konjac can also be made into a popular East Asian fruit jelly snack, known variously in the US as lychee cups (after a typical flavor) or konjac candy, usually served in bite-sized plastic cups. This fruit jelly was first sold in Japan in 1979.

==== Choking risk ====
Perhaps because of several highly publicized deaths and near-deaths in the San Francisco Bay Area among children and elderly people caused by suffocation while eating konjac candy, the US Food and Drug Administration (FDA) issued product warnings in 2001, and there were subsequent recalls in the US and Canada. Choking and intestinal blockage risk warnings have been published at more recent websites.

Unlike gelatine and some other commonly used gelling agents, konjac fruit jelly does not melt readily in the mouth. Some products form a gel strong enough to require chewing to disintegrate the gel. Though the product is intended to be eaten by gently squeezing the container, a consumer can suck the product out with enough force to unintentionally lodge it in the trachea. Because of this hazard, the European Union and Australia banned konjac fruit jelly.

Some konjac jelly snacks are not of a size and consistency that pose a choking risk, but are nonetheless affected by the government bans. Some products that remain in East Asian markets have an increased size, unusual shape, and more delicate consistency than the round, plug-like gels that were associated with the choking incidents. The snacks usually have warning labels advising parents to make sure their children chew the jelly thoroughly before swallowing.

In 2008, Japan's largest manufacturer of konjac snacks, MannanLife, temporarily stopped producing the jellies after a 21-month-old Japanese boy choked to death on a frozen MannanLife konjac jelly. 17 people died from choking on konjac between 1995 and 2008. MannanLife konjac jelly's packaging added a note to consumers, advising them to cut the product into smaller pieces before serving it to small children. To prevent such accidents, they developed and began selling drinkable konjac jelly in 2005.

In 1999, 8-year-old Michelle Enrile from San Jose, California, choked on a piece of konjac gel candy. She lapsed into a coma and died 27 months later at age 11. The Enriles won a $16.7 million judgment against the Taiwanese manufacturer of the candy.

=== Vegan seafood alternative ===
Konjac corm powder has a noticeably fishy smell and is used as an ingredient in vegan alternative seafood products. It can be incorporated into plant-based versions of seafood. For Chinese cooking, thin strands of konjac gel can be used as substitute for shark fins when preparing a plant-based version of shark fin soup.

=== Other uses ===
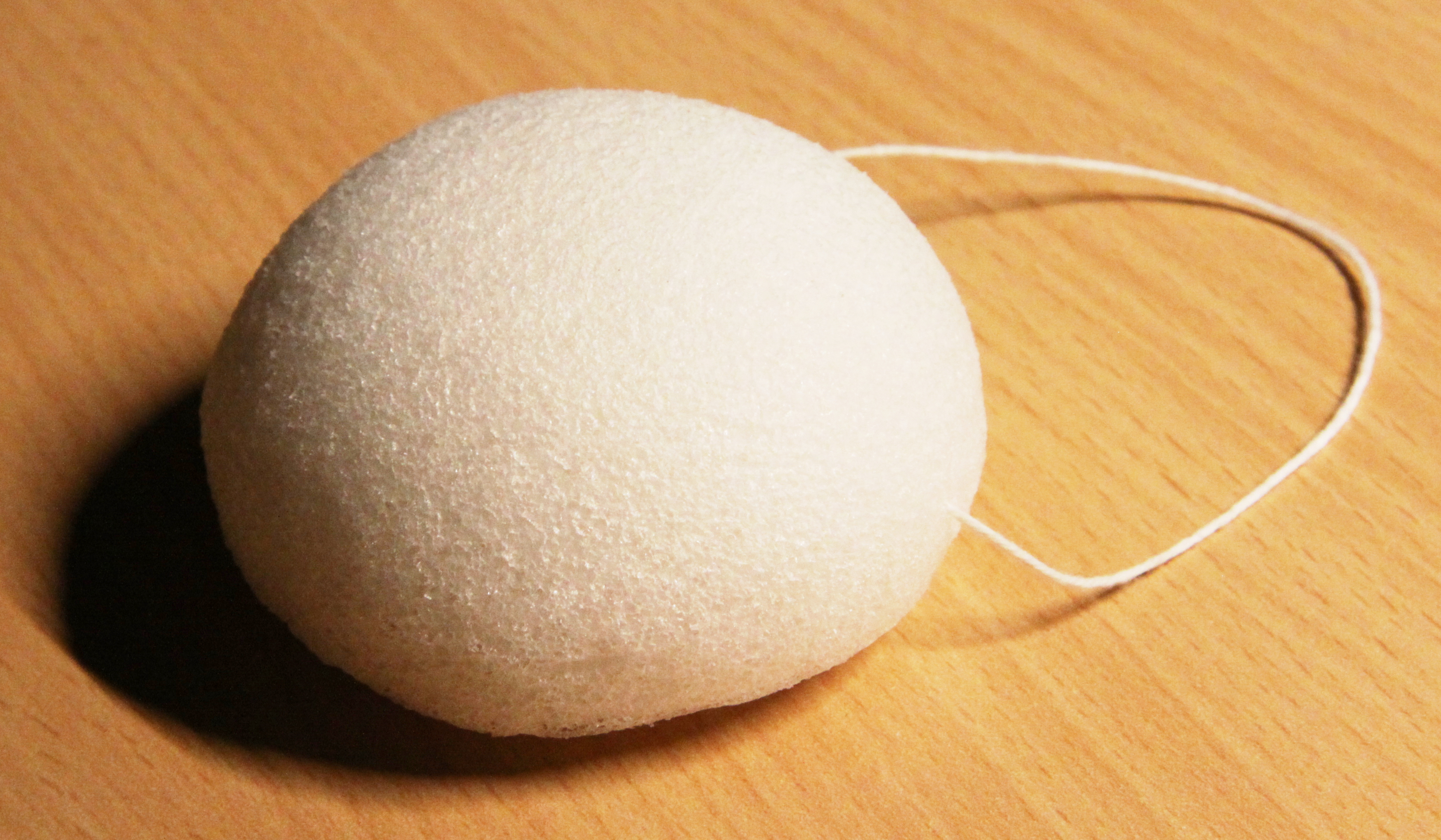
A konjac sponge for facial cleansing

Konjac can also be used for facial massage accessories, which are popular in Korea and gaining popularity in the West. Most commonly this is through the use of a konjac sponge, which is unique in that it can be used on sensitive skin that may become easily irritated with more common exfoliating tools (such as loofahs or washcloths).

It can be used in the formulation of drugs and devices such as oral colon-targeting drug delivery systems (OCDDS), which enable drugs to be delivered directly to the colon.

In traditional hand papermaking in Japan, konnyaku imparts strength to paper for dyeing, rubbing, folding—and other manipulations, such as momigami.

Shirataki noodles have gained popularity in the US for their low carbohydrate content.

== See also ==
- Muk
- Shirataki noodles
