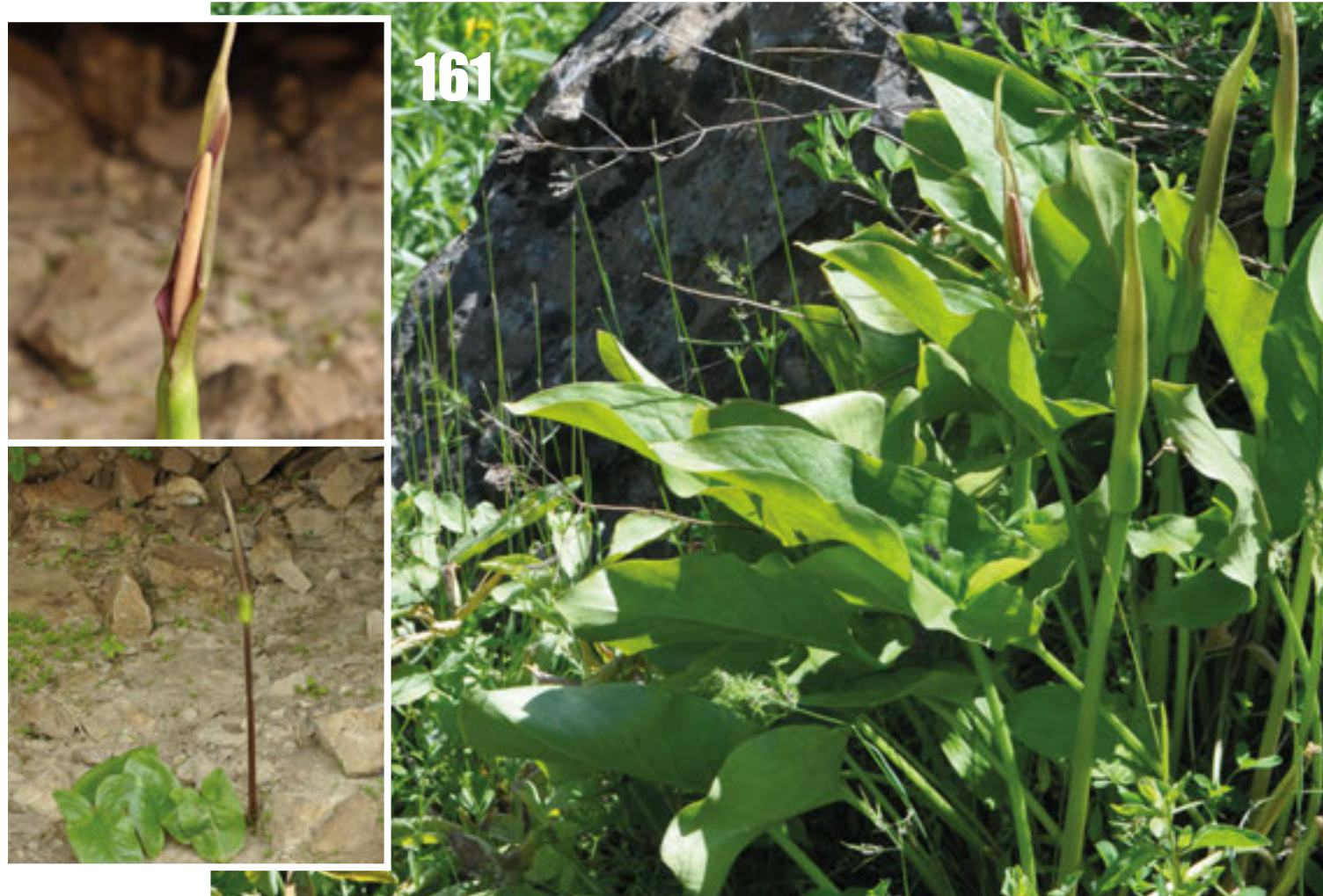

Scientific classification
- Kingdom: Plantae
- Clade: Tracheophytes
- Clade: Angiosperms
- Clade: Monocots
- Order: Alismatales
- Family: Araceae
- Genus: Arum
- Species: A. korolkowii

Binomial name
- Arum korolkowii Regel (1873)
- Range of A. korolkowii (precise locations only)

= Arum korolkowii =

Species of plant

Arum korolkowii is a woodland plant species of the family Araceae.

== Distribution ==
It is found in Afghanistan, Iran, Kazakhstan, Kyrgyzstan, Tajikistan, Turkmenistan, and Uzbekistan.

== Gallery ==
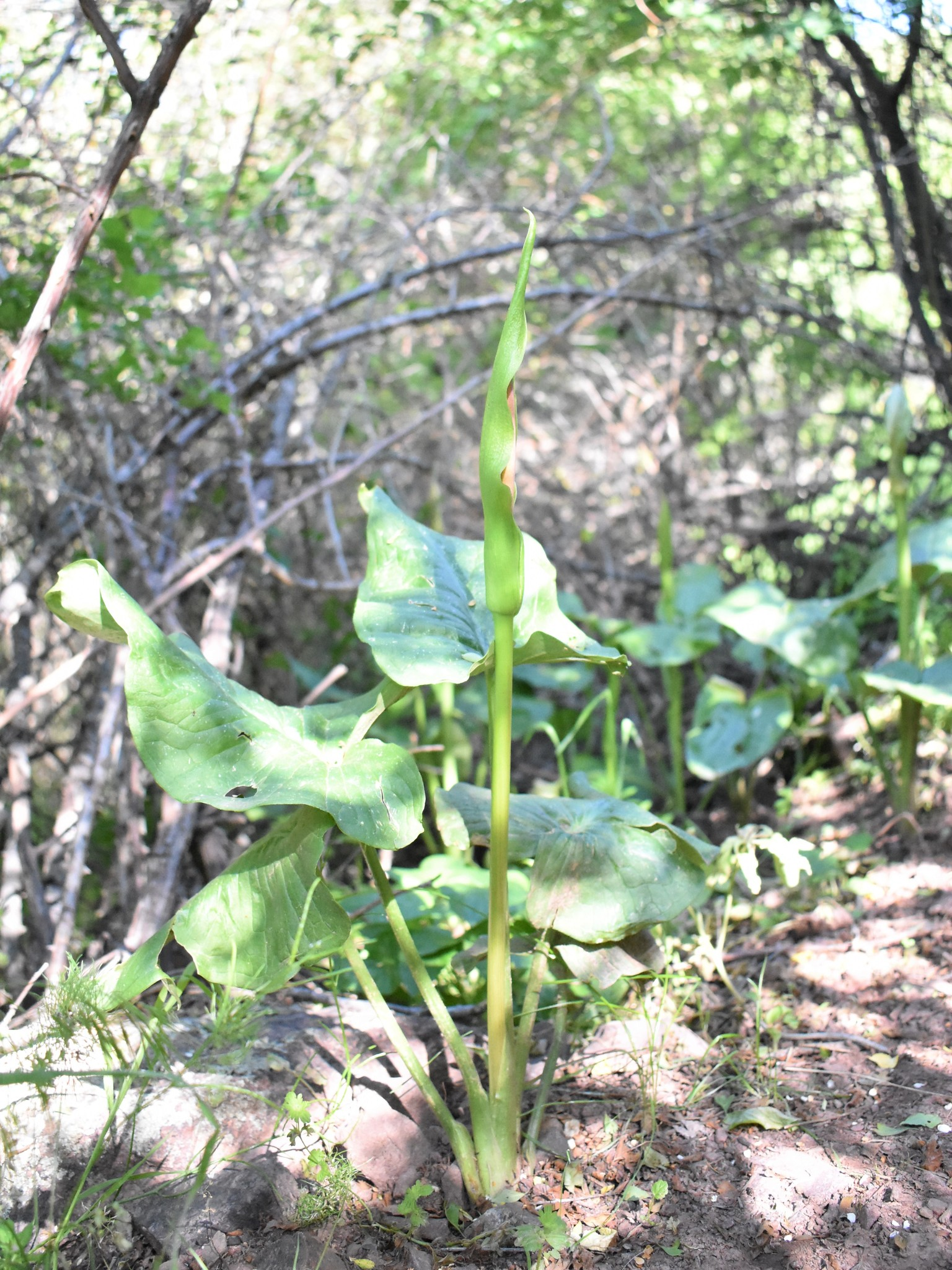
Habitus

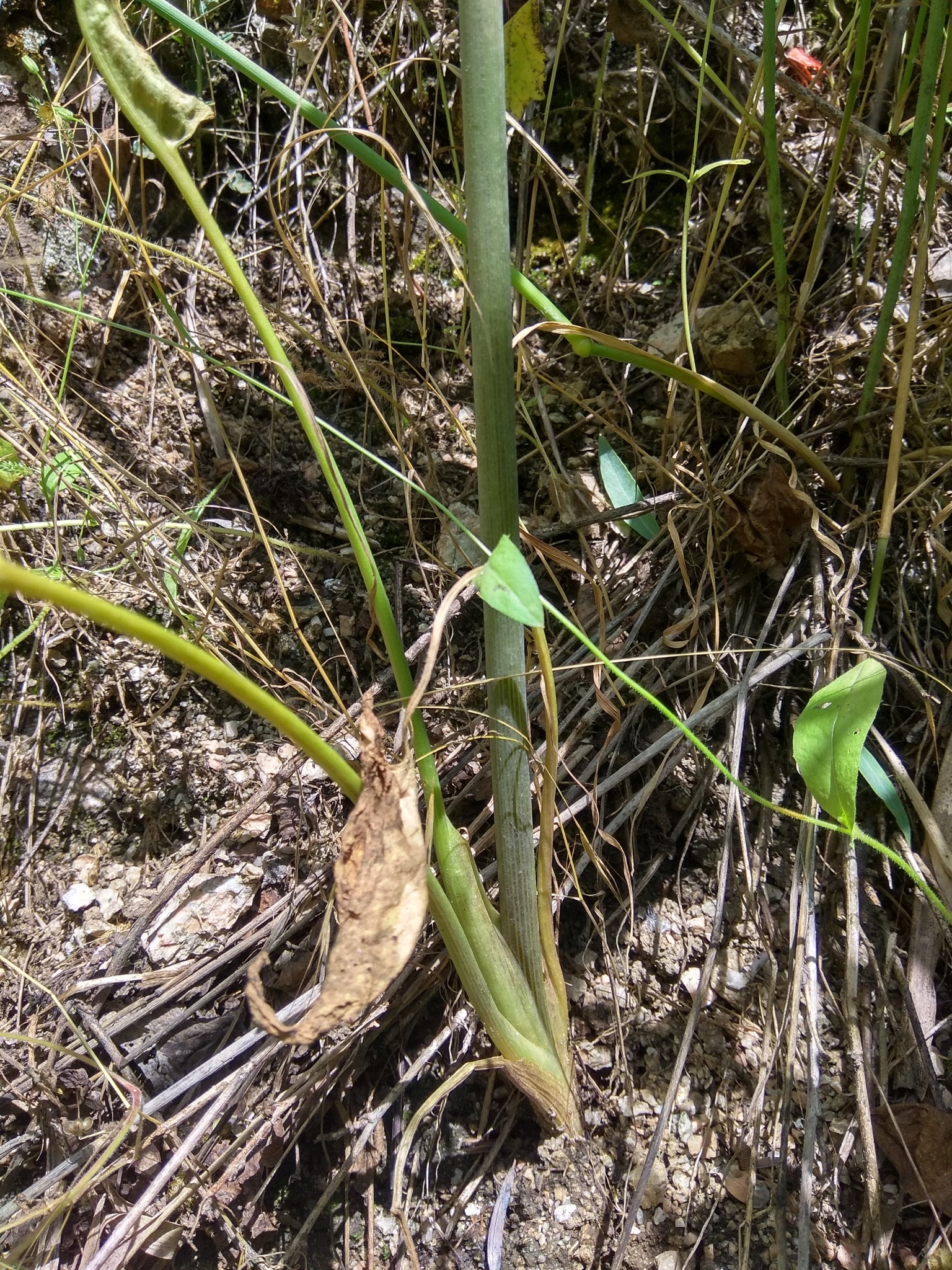
Stalk

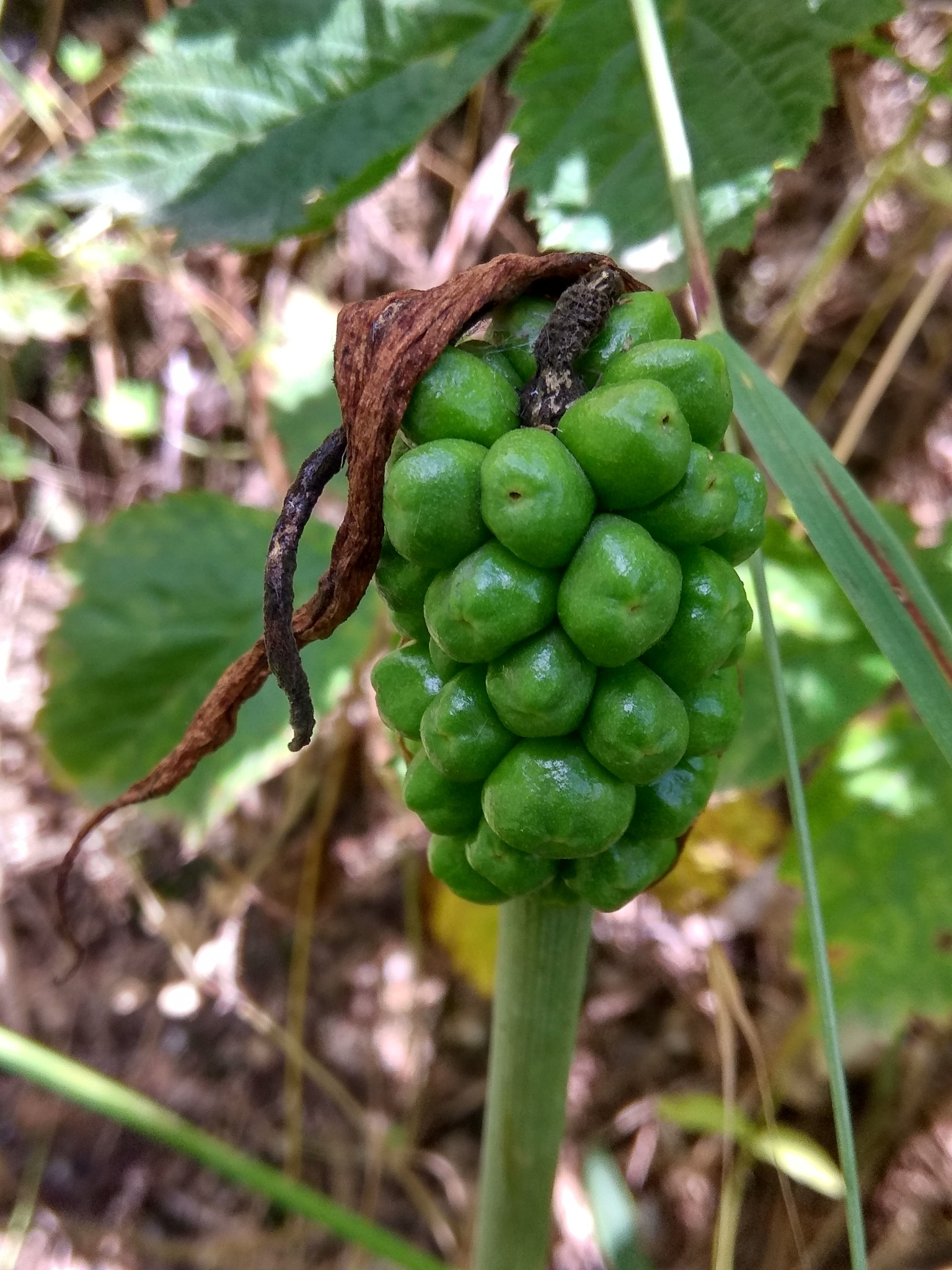
Fruit (unripe)

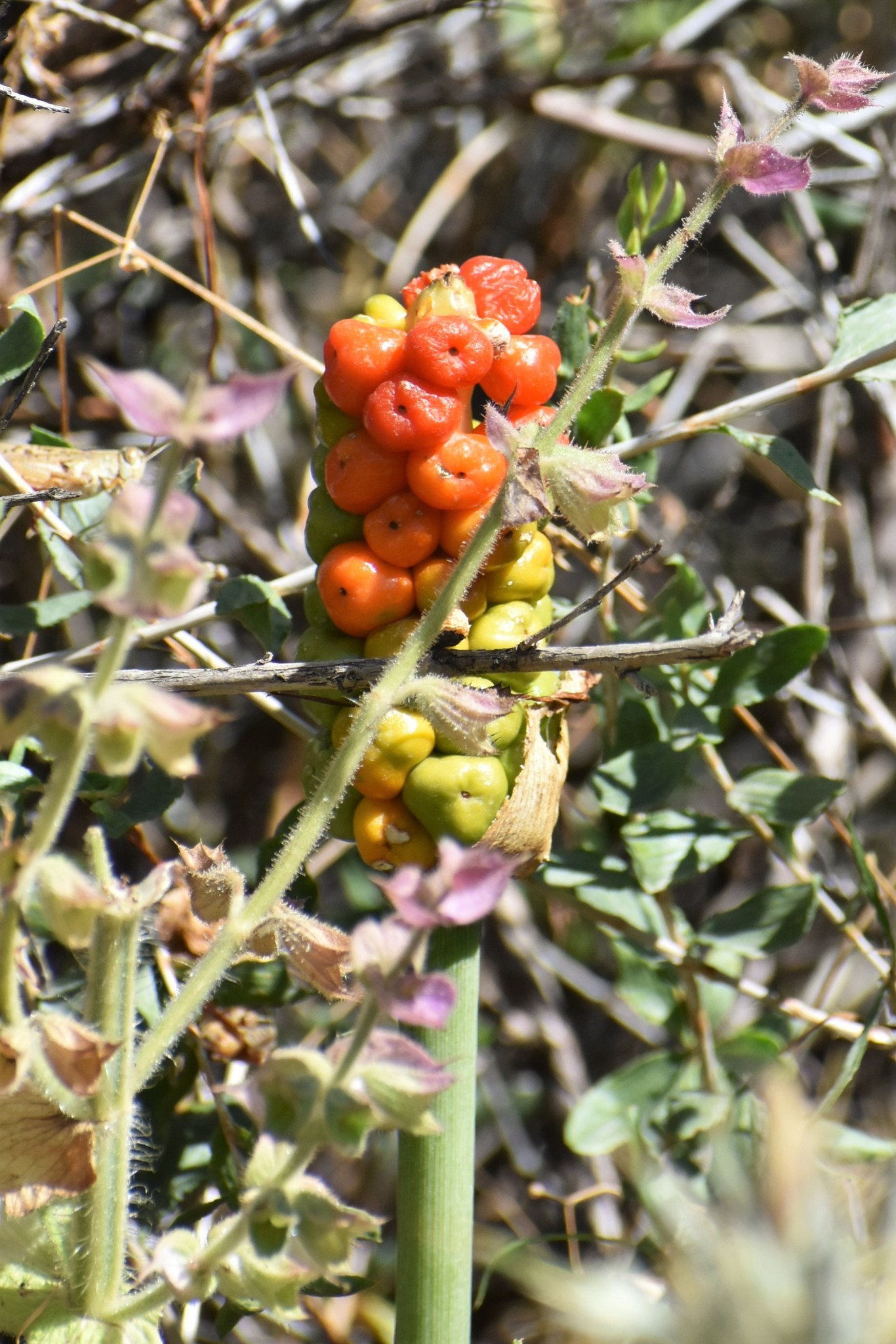
Fruit (ripe)

== Bibliography ==
- GBIF (2025-05-24). "Arum korolkowii Regel Occurrence Download". Global Biodiversity Information Facility. doi:10.15468/dl.9fd7vn.
- Yeginbay, Aigerim; et al. (2024-01-16). "Biology of the medicinal plant Arum korolkowii Regel (Arum)". Plant Science Today. 11 (1): 602–605. doi:10.14719/pst.3137. ISSN 2348-1900.
- Kew (2023). "Arum korolkowii Regel". International Plant Names Index and World Checklist of Vascular Plants.
