= Carex turkestanica =

Scientific classification
- Kingdom: Plantae
- Clade: Tracheophytes
- Clade: Angiosperms
- Clade: Monocots
- Clade: Commelinids
- Order: Poales
- Family: Cyperaceae
- Genus: Carex
- Species: C. turkestanica

Binomial name
- Carex turkestanica Regel

Synonyms
- Carex conglobata var. acuta Litv.; Carex ivanoviae f. subglacialis Yu.E.Alexeev; Carex nitida var. acuta (Litv.) O.Fedtsch. & B.Fedtsch.; Carex nitida var. aspera (Boeckeler) Kük.; Carex obesa var. aspera Boeckeler; Carex orientalis Meinsh.; Carex turkestanica subsp. beleensis Zolot.; Carex verae Ovcz. & Czukav.

Species of plant in the sedge family

Carex turkestanica is a species of true sedge in the family Cyperaceae, native to the Altai, Central Asia (except Turkmenistan), Afghanistan, Pakistan, the western Himalayas, and Xinjiang and Gansu in China. It is found in a wide variety of mountainous habitats, where it is often co-dominant.
