= Galactoglucomannan =

Galactoglucomannan is a water-soluble hemicellulose, consisting of galactose, glucose and mannose. Many softwood species, e.g. Norway spruce are rich of galactoglucomannans and can contain it up to 10–20%.

== Structure ==
Structure of galactoglucomannan

Galactoglucomannan consists of a backbone of randomly distributed (1→4)-linked mannose and glucose units with (1→6)-linked galactose units attached to mannose units. The hydroxyl groups in locations C2 and C3 in mannose are partially substituted by acetyl groups.
