= Glucomannan =

Names
- IUPAC name β(1→4)-d-gluco-d-mannoglycan

Identifiers
CAS Number	11078-31-2
ChEBI	CHEBI:17020
ChemSpider	30791437
KEGG	C01810
PubChem CID	24892726
- Except where otherwise noted, data are given for materials in their standard state (at 25 °C [77 °F], 100 kPa). Infobox references

Glucomannan is a water-soluble polysaccharide that is considered a dietary fiber. It is a hemicellulose component in the cell walls of some plant species. Glucomannan is a food additive used as an emulsifier and thickener. It is a major source of mannan oligosaccharide (MOS) found in nature, the other being galactomannan, which is insoluble.

Products containing glucomannan, under a variety of brand names, are marketed as dietary supplements with claims they can relieve constipation and help lower cholesterol levels. Since 2010 they are legally marketed in Europe as helping with weight loss for people who are overweight and eating a diet with restricted calories, but as of 2020 there was no good evidence that glucomannan helped weight loss. Glucomannan may lower LDL cholesterol by up to 10 percent, according to one meta-study.

Supplements containing glucomannans pose a risk for choking and bowel obstruction if they are not taken with sufficient water. Other adverse effects include diarrhea, belching, and bloating; in one study people taking glucomannans had higher triglyceride levels.

Glucomannans are also used to supplement animal feed for farmed animals, to cause the animals gain weight more quickly.

== Chemistry ==
Glucomannan is mainly a straight-chain polymer, with a small amount of branching. The component sugars are β-(1→4)-linked D-mannose and D-glucose in a ratio of 1.6:1. The degree of branching is about 8% through β-(1→6)-glucosyl linkages.

Glucomannan with α-(1→6)-linked galactose units in side branches is called galactoglucomannan.

== Biological function ==
In the yeast cell wall, mannan oligosaccharides are present in complex molecules that are linked to the protein moiety. There are two main locations of mannan oligosaccharides in the surface area of Saccharomyces cerevisiae cell wall.

They can be attached to the cell wall proteins as part of –O and –N glycosyl groups and also constitute elements of large α-D-mannanose polysaccharides (α-D-Mannans), which are built of α-(1,2)- and α-(1,3)- D-mannose branches (from 1 to 5 rings long), which are attached to long α-(1,6)-D-mannose chains.

This specific combination of various functionalities involves mannan oligosaccharides-protein conjugates and highly hydrophilic and structurally variable 'brush-like' mannan oligosaccharides structures that can fit to various receptors of animal digestive tracts, and to the receptors on the surface of bacterial membranes, impacts these molecules' bioactivity. Mannan oligosaccharides-protein conjugates are involved in interactions with the animal's immune system and as result enhance immune system activity. They also play a role in animal antioxidant and antimutagenic defense.

== Natural sources ==
Glucomannan comprises 40% by dry weight of the roots, or corm, of the konjac plant. Another culinary source is salep, ground from the roots of certain orchids and used in Greek and Turkish cuisine. However, these orchid species are protected in the whole EU and the trade of salep is strictly forbidden. Glucomannan is also a hemicellulose that is present in large amounts in the wood of conifers and in smaller amounts in the wood of dicotyledons. Glucomannan is also a constituent of bacterial, plant and yeast cell wall with differences in the branches or glycosidic linkages in the linear structure.

== Uses ==
=== Human food additive ===
Glucomannan is a food additive used as an emulsifier and thickener with the E number E425(ii).

Glucomannan-rich salep powder provides the elastic and chewy texture characteristic of dondurma, a traditional Turkish mastic-flavored ice cream.

Konjac, also rich in glucomannan, is widely used for its jelly-like texture. It found use in shirataki noodles, in fruit jellies snacks (with choking risk), and as a substitute for gelatin.

=== Human dietary supplement ===
Glucomannan is an ingredient in a variety of dietary supplement products marketed with claims that they aid in weight loss, but medical research has found no good evidence to support its use for this purpose. The claim is that it makes a gel when mixed with water, which can take up space in the stomach and linger there longer than water alone would, inducing a person to feel full after having eaten a smaller amount of food.

In Europe and Canada, glucomannan dietary supplements can be marketed with claims to lower cholesterol levels and to relieve constipation.

Data from a randomized controlled clinical trial suggests that glucomannan dietary supplements help regulate the hormone ghrelin and might help control appetite in people with Type 2 diabetes.

==== Health risks ====
A health advisory was released by Health Canada stating the following: "Natural health products containing the ingredient glucomannan in tablet, capsule or powder form, which are currently on the Canadian market, have a potential for harm if taken without at least 250 ml or 8 ounces of water or other fluid. The risk includes choking and/or blockage of the throat, esophagus or intestine, according to international adverse reaction case reports. It is also important to note that these products should not be taken immediately before going to bed."

Other adverse effects include diarrhea, belching, and bloating; in one study people taking glucomannans had higher triglyceride levels.

==== Consumer issues ====
Several companies have been determined by the Federal Trade Commission (FTC) or the Food and Drug Administration (FDA) to have, at some time, violated the Federal Food, Drug, and Cosmetic Act. The companies include Vitacost, PediaLean, Herbal Worldwide Holdings, BioTrim, and others. The company Obesity Research Institute, the marketer of FiberThin, Zylotrim, Propolene and Lipozene, settled FTC charges that their misleading weight-loss claims violated federal laws by agreeing to pay $1.5 million in consumer redress.

In 2001, a number of jelly-type candy products containing konjac-derived glucomannan were barred from import by the U.S. Food and Drug Administration due to choking hazards.

=== Dietary supplements for animals ===
It is also used as dietary supplement for farmed animals in order to help them gain more weight from food, called the feed conversion ratio. The effect of mannan oligosaccharides on animal performance was analysed in meta-analyses for poultry, pigs, and calves.
