= Mannans =

Polysaccharides formed from mannose

Subunit of a typical mannan showing four 1,4-linked beta-D-mannose units, one with a galactose side chain.

Mannans are polymers containing the sugar mannose as a principal component. They are a type of polysaccharide found in hemicellulose, a major source of biomass found in higher plants such as softwoods. These polymers also typically contain two other sugars, galactose and glucose. They are often branched (unlike cellulose).

== Structural diversity ==
Plant mannans have β(1-4) linkages, occasionally with α(1-6) galactose branches, forming galactomannans. They are insoluble and a form of storage polysaccharide. Ivory nut is a source of mannans. An additional type is galactoglucomannan found in soft wood with a mixed mannose/glucose β(1-4) backbone. Conjac and salep have glucomannans with β(1-4) linkages. Many mannans are acetylated and some from marine sources, have sulfate esters side chains.

Yeast have a different type of glucomannan in their cell wall, with a α(1-6) linked backbone and α(1-2) and α(1-3) linked glucose branches, which may also contain phosphodiester bonds. Enzymatic digestion or acid catalysis can help solubilize the glucomannan. It is serologically similar to structures found on mammalian glycoproteins. Detection of mannan leads to lysis in the mannan-binding lectin pathway.

== Synthesis and degradation ==
Guanosine diphosphate mannose is the precursor to mannans. As a simplification, the diphosphate group is shown in its protonated form.

GDP-mannose is a substrate for glycosyltransferase for enzymes called mannosyltransferases.

== Biosynthesis ==
GDP-mannose is produced from GTP and mannose-6-phosphate by the enzyme mannose-1-phosphate guanylyltransferase.

The degradation of mannans (and many related forms of hemicellulose) has been well studied. The hydrolysis of the main mannan backbone is catalyzed by various enzymes including β-mannosidase, β-glucosidase, and β-mannase. The side chains are degraded by esterases and α-galactosidase.

When a long chain of mannan is hydrolyzed into shorter chains, these smaller molecules are known as mannan oligosaccharide (MOS). MOS by definition can be produced from either insoluble galactomannan or soluble glucomannan, although the latter type is more widely marketed.

Glucomannan MOS is used as prebiotics in animal husbandry and nutritional supplements due to its bioactivity.

== Etymology ==
From 'manna', produced by several species of tree and shrub e.g. Fraxinus ornus from whose secretions mannitol was originally isolated.

== See also ==
- Alfa mannan degradation
- Mannan oligosaccharides (MOS)
