= Asuman Baytop =

Turkish botanist (1920–2015)

Dr. Asuman Baytop
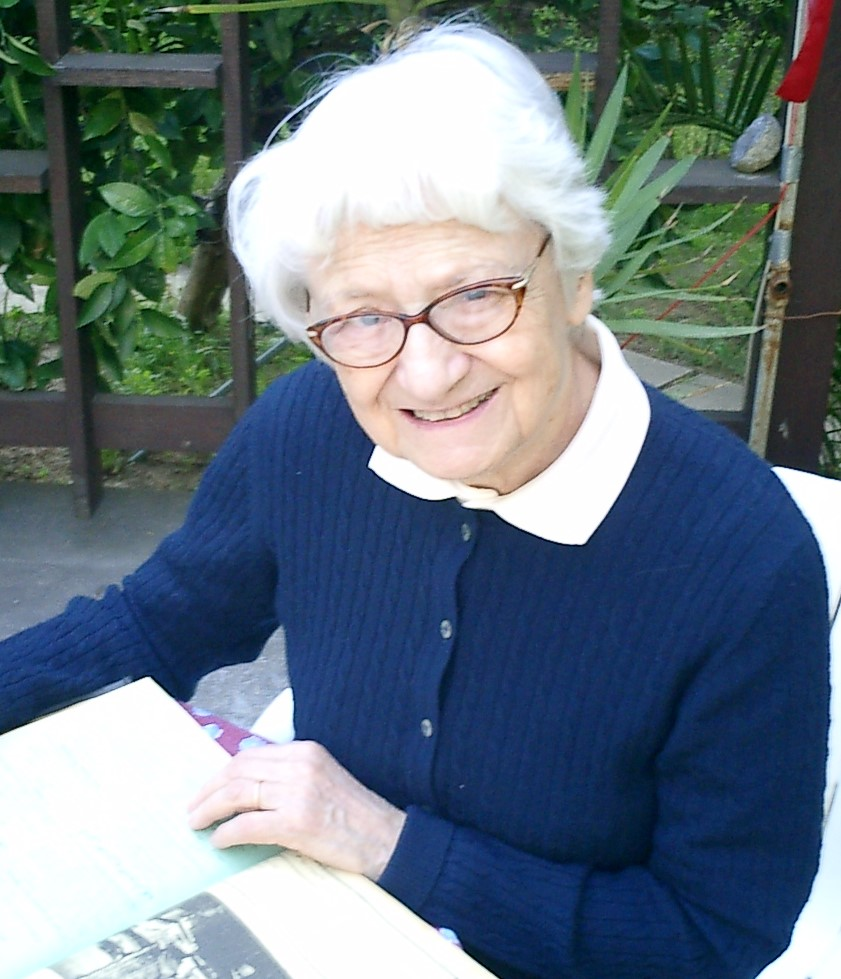
- Dr. Asuman Baytop, 2003
- Born: March 27, 1920; Istanbul
- Died: February 18, 2015 (aged 94); Istanbul
- Occupations: botanist, pharmacologist, educator
- Spouse: Turhan Baytop

Asuman Baytop (27 March 1920 – 18 February 2015) was a Turkish botanist, plant collector, pharmacologist, and educator known for her research regarding the medicinal properties of the flora of Turkey. In 1964, she founded the Department of Pharmaceutical Botany at Istanbul University, and established the department's herbarium, to which she contributed more than 23,000 specimens. She is also noted for describing several species of crocus, and the species Allium baytopiorum and Colchicum baytopiorum are named in her honour. She was married to fellow botanist Turhan Baytop.

== Early life and education ==
Born in Istanbul to Dr. Mehmet Kamil, one of the doctors of Turkey's founder Mustafa Kemal Ataturk, and Meliha Berk, Asuman Baytop was their third daughter. Entering Istanbul University's Pharmaceutical Botany and Genetics Institute as an assistant in September 1943, Baytop worked in general botany, pharmaceutical botany, and pharmacognosy courses and laboratories as an assistant of Alfred Heilbronn, a German-Turkish botanist who is considered the founder of modern botany in Turkey. Baytop completed her bachelor's degree in 1943. She subsequently pursued doctoral studies at the Pharmaceutical Institute of the Eidgenössische Technische Hochschule (ETH) in Zurich, Switzerland. Under the supervision of Professor Hans Flück, she completed her PhD thesis titled "Contributions à l'étude pharmacognosique de 4 espèces alpines d'Achillea" in 1949.

== Academic career ==
Upon returning to Turkey in 1949, Baytop was appointed as an assistant at the School of Pharmacy, Istanbul University. In 1964, she established the Department of Pharmaceutical Botany at the university and served as its director until her retirement in March 1987. Even after retirement, she continued her research and contributed to the department's activities as a consultant professor emerita.

From 1965 to 1987, Baytop served as a member and later head of the Editorial Board of the Journal of Faculty of Pharmacy of Istanbul University, continuing as an editorial board member for two years after her retirement.

== Botanical contributions ==
=== Plant collection and expeditions ===
Baytop began collecting plants in 1941 during her student years, on an excursion near Istanbul organised by Professor A. Heilbronn. She continued herborising in the Swiss and Austrian Alps while working on her doctoral thesis. After returning to Turkey, she conducted approximately 160 botanical excursions up to 1987, collecting extensively throughout the country. Often referred to as a 'tireless plant collector' by her daughter, she organized 50 plant-collecting trips to the Thrace region, 25 to the Marmara Region (excluding Istanbul), and 75 to different regions in Anatolia.

Her collection efforts yielded:

- 5,870 plant specimens from around Istanbul
- 7,470 specimens from European Turkey
- About 16,000 specimens from Anatolia (including the Istanbul collection)

Her complete original collection, housed in the ISTE Herbarium (Herbarium of Istanbul University Faculty of Pharmacy), contains about 23,300 specimens. The Flora of Turkey (1965-2000) cites 1,876 specimens collected by Baytop. Her contribution to documenting the flora of European Turkey earned her a medal of honour in 1978 at the Second International Symposium on the Problems of Balkan Flora and Vegetation.

=== New species and taxonomy ===
Baytop described several new plant taxa for botanical science, including:

- Lycium anatolicum A.Baytop & R.R.Mill
- Nonea macrantha (Riedl) A.Baytop
- Nonea pulla (L.) DC. subsp. scabrisquamata A.Baytop
- Roemeria carica A.Baytop
- Silene anatolica Melzh. & A.Baytop
- Gladiolus attilae Kit Tan, B.Mathew & A.Baytop

She also collected numerous new species during her excursions that were subsequently described by other botanists.

== Academic contributions ==
=== Research and publications ===
In addition to her work on the Turkish flora, Baytop contributed considerably to the teaching of pharmaceutical botany, publishing books and atlases for students and researchers. She compiled and published the catalogue of the ISTE Herbarium in three volumes between 1984 and 1992.

After 1987, Baytop expanded her research interests to include the history of botany. Her pioneering book Türkiye'de Botanik Tarihi Araştırmaları ('Studies on the History of Botany in Turkey') was followed by 71 papers on this subject between 1989 and 2013. Baytop authored nearly 200 scientific publications throughout her career, with her first article published in 1943. Her work appeared in numerous journals including Turkish Journal of Botany, Folia Pharmaceutica, Curtis's Botanical Magazine, and Acta Pharmaceutica Sciencia. Even after her retirement in 1987 and her last collecting trip in 1990, she continued her scientific studies on Turkey's flora.

She also authored two important lexicographical works that became reference standards for Turkish botanists: Bitkilerin Bilimsel Adlarındaki Niteleyiciler ('Epithets in plants' scientific names') and İngilizce-Türkçe Botanik Kılavuzu ('An English-Turkish Botanical Guidebook').

Baytop supervised eight doctoral theses between 1959 and 1982, mentoring a new generation of botanists who would continue research on the Turkish flora.

== Recognition and honours ==
In recognition of her floristics work and services in creating and enriching the Herbarium ISTE, Baytop was awarded the Service Award (TÜBİTAK Hizmet Ödülü) from Scientific and Technological Research Council of Turkey, The Scientific and Technological Research Council of Turkey, in 1999.

The eighth volume of Peter Hadland Davis's monumental "Flora of Turkey and the East Aegean Islands" was dedicated to Asuman and Turhan Baytop in recognition of their contributions over many years.

=== Eponymy ===
At least 15 plant species were named in Baytop's honour, including:

- Allium baytopiorum Kollmann & N.Özhatay
- Allium cyrilli Ten. subsp. asumaniae N.Özhatay & İ.Genç
- Asphodeline baytopiae Tuzlaci
- Cirsium baytopiae P.H.Davis & Parris
- Colchicum baytopiorum C.D.Brickell
- Crocus asumaniae B.Mathew & T.Baytop
- Crocus baytopiorum B.Mathew & T.Baytop
- Fritillaria asumaniae Wallis & N.Özhatay
- Rosa 'ASUMAN' Kit Tan & Zielinski

== Legacy ==
Baytop's contributions to botanical science extended beyond her taxonomic work to include education, conservation, and documentation of Turkey's rich plant diversity. Her work documenting medicinal plants and their vernacular names helped preserve traditional knowledge, while her extensive plant collections remain an important scientific resource. Her pioneering work on the history of botany in Turkey established a new field of scholarly inquiry.

A special issue of the "Osmanlı Bilimi Araştırmaları / Studies in Ottoman Science" (Vol. XI, 1-2, 2009–2010) was published as the Asuman Baytop Festschrift, including a comprehensive biography and list of her publications compiled by her daughter, professor Feza Günergun.

The standard author abbreviation A.Baytop is used to indicate this person as the author when citing a botanical name.
