= Sternbergia schubertii =

- CITES Appendix II

Scientific classification
- Kingdom: Plantae
- Clade: Embryophytes
- Clade: Tracheophytes
- Clade: Spermatophytes
- Clade: Angiosperms
- Clade: Monocots
- Order: Asparagales
- Family: Amaryllidaceae
- Subfamily: Amaryllidoideae
- Genus: Sternbergia
- Species: S. schubertii

Binomial name
- Sternbergia schubertii Schenk

Species of flowering plant

Sternbergia schubertii is a diminutive autumn-flowering bulb that was described in 1840 from near Torbalı in western Turkey, then vanished from the botanical record for more than 150 years. A targeted survey in 1998 located a second, and so far only other, population about 300 km to the south-west in the Lycian section of the western Taurus Mountains, where the species grows on stony, east-facing limestone slopes at 180–300 m (590–980 ft) amid open scrub of Euphorbia, Cyclamen and scattered Olea europaea and Pinus brutia. The rediscovery confirms that S. schubertii is a narrow Turkish endemic and casts doubts on earlier records from elsewhere; its tiny extent of occurrence and attractiveness to bulb collectors make it highly vulnerable to disturbance.

Morphologically the species sits between the widespread S. lutea and the much smaller S. colchiciflora but is readily recognised in the field. The spherical bulb is 1–1.5 cm across and gives rise to two or three arching, dark-green leaves before the flower appears—a useful distinction from S. colchiciflora, whose flowers emerge first. At anthesis the leaves measure 3–6 cm long and 7–9 mm wide, later extending to 12–22 cm (4.7–8.7 in); their margins bear microscopic teeth that leave the surface slightly rough to the touch. The solitary bright-yellow bloom is carried on a slender tube 2–5 cm long so that it stands clear of the ground, again contrasting with the ground-hugging flowers of S. colchiciflora. Outer perianth segments reach about 25 mm × 10 mm, the inner segments around 20 mm × 5 mm. After pollination the ovary enlarges underground and is pushed above the surface on a short stalk; the ovoid capsule (≈ 15 mm × 10 mm) matures by early spring and contains olive-brown seeds 3.5–4.5 mm in diameter, each with a fleshy food-body (elaiosome that attracts ants and aids dispersal.
