= S. candida =

S. candida may refer to:

- Salix candida, the sageleaf willow, a shrub species found in northern United States and Canada
- Sidalcea candida, the white checkermallow or white checkerbloom, a wildflower species found from Nevada to Wyoming and south to the southern part of New Mexico
- Stanhopea candida, an orchid species endemic to southern tropical America
- Sternbergia candida, a flowering plant species in the genus Sternbergia

== See also ==
- Candida (disambiguation)
