= Iris xanthospuria =

Scientific classification
- Kingdom: Plantae
- Clade: Tracheophytes
- Clade: Angiosperms
- Clade: Monocots
- Order: Asparagales
- Family: Iridaceae
- Genus: Iris
- Subgenus: Iris subg. Limniris
- Section: Iris sect. Limniris
- Series: Iris ser. Spuriae
- Species: I. xanthospuria

Binomial name
- Iris xanthospuria Brian Mathew and T.Baytop

Synonyms
- Chamaeiris xanthospuria (B.Mathew & T.Baytop) M.B.Crespo; Xyridion xanthospurium (B.Mathew & T.Baytop) Rodion.

Species of flowering plant

Iris xanthospuria is a species in the genus Iris, it is also in the subgenus Limniris and in the series Spuriae. It is a rhizomatous perennial plant, from Turkey with yellow flowers. It was originally known as 'Turkey yellow'. It is cultivated as an ornamental plant in temperate regions.

== Description ==
It is different in form to Iris pseudacorus, another yellow flowering iris found in Turkey.

It has a thick rhizome, covered with the fibrous remains of the bases of the previous seasons leaves.

It has grey-green, tough and erect leaves. They can grow up to between 30 and 80 cm (12 and 31 in) long, and between 1 and 2 cm wide. The leaves are generally equal or shorter than the stems, and also evergreen.

It has stems with between 1 and 2 compact, erect branches, that can grow up to between 30 and 100 cm (12 and 39 in) long.

The stems have 2–5, green spathes, (leaves of the flower bud), that are 6–12 cm long, with membranous margins. The stems or peduncle hold 2–5, terminal (top of stem) flowers, between spring and summer, in April–May.

The flowers are smaller than Iris crocea, 9–11 cm (4–4 in) in diameter, that come in shades of yellow, deep yellow flowers, golden yellow, lemon-yellow, and vivid yellow. deep, rich yellow flowers.

It has 2 pairs of petals, 3 large sepals (outer petals), known as the 'falls' and 3 inner, smaller petals (or tepals, known as the 'standards'. The falls are 5.5–7.5 cm (2–3 in) long and have orbicular blade, broadly elliptical or ovate, 2.5–3 cm long and 0.7–1.2 (−1.5) cm wide. They sometimes have a darker yellow patch on the blade of the falls. They also have an un-winged claw (section closest to the stem). The upright standards are oblanceolate and 5–7 cm (2–3 in) long and 1.3–2.4 cm wide. They are also paler in colour.

It has 2–4 cm long pedicels, 1.5–2 cm long ovary, that has a beak-like point and a small, 0.7–1 cm long perianth tube.

It has 4–4.5 cm long and 0.7–1.2 cm wide style branches, that are sharply recurved, and have broadly triangular lobes that are 4–5 mm long. They are also paler in colour, similar to the standards.

After the iris has flowered, it produces an oblong, seed capsule, that is 4–5 cm long, with a tapering beak, up to 3 cm long.

=== Biochemistry ===
As most irises are diploid, having two sets of chromosomes, this can be used to identify hybrids and classification of groupings. It has a chromosome count: 2n=40.

== Taxonomy ==
In Russia it is known as 'Ksanthospuria Iris'.

In Czech, it is known as 'Žlutěpochybný iris'.

In Turkish, it is known as 'Altin susen', (meaning 'Gold Iris').

It has the common name of 'Turkey yellow'.

The Latin specific epithet xanthospuria refers to a combination of 'xanthos' meaning yellow, and 'spuria' from Iris spuria.

In 1948, Dr. Lee W. Lenz was given some seeds from Professor Haydar Bagda of Ankara University. He grew these into a plant, which he called "Turkey Yellow".

It was first published and described as Iris xanthospuria by Brian Mathew and Turhan Baytop in 'The Garden' (published in London) Vol.107 Issue11, page446 in 1982.

It was verified by United States Department of Agriculture Agricultural Research Service on 3 December 2004.

Iris xanthospuria is an accepted name by the RHS.

== Distribution and habitat ==
It is native to western Asia.

=== Range ===
It was first grown from seed, collected near Ankara, Turkey, in 1948. Other specimens have been found in Muğla and Antakya.

It is found in Turkey,(including along the edges of Koycegiz Lake, in Hatay,) and Syria.

=== Habitat ===
Iris xanthospuria grows in marshy meadows, in swampy areas, and beside stream sides. Some habitats are known to dry out in summer.

It has also been found within Eucalyptus plantations.

It grows at altitudes of between 40 and 1000m above sea level.

== Conservation ==
It is listed as rare and threatened.

Some plants have been found in Marmaris National Park and the Gokova and Datça-Bozburun Special Protection Areas. With other rare endemic plants such as; Allium sandrasic, Arenaria lusche, Centaurea cariensis, Eryngium thorifoli, Ferulago mughlai, Gypsophila confertiflor, Isatis pinnatilob, Sedum carica, Senecio sandrasicus, Sideritis leptocla, Sideritis albiflora, Silene tunicoides and Thymus cariensis.

== Cultivation ==
It is hardy to −15 °C.

It prefers to grow in good heavy garden soil, it is tolerant of most soils, as long as there is plenty of moisture during the growing season.

It prefers positions in full sun.

=== Propagation ===
It can also be propagated by division (splitting the rhizomes of established plants) or by seed growing.

=== Hybrids and cultivars ===
It is used in hybridization, due to the yellow colour of the flowers.

== Sources ==
- Davis, P. H., ed. 1965–1988. Flora of Turkey and the east Aegean islands.
- Mathew, B. 1981. The Iris. 119.
