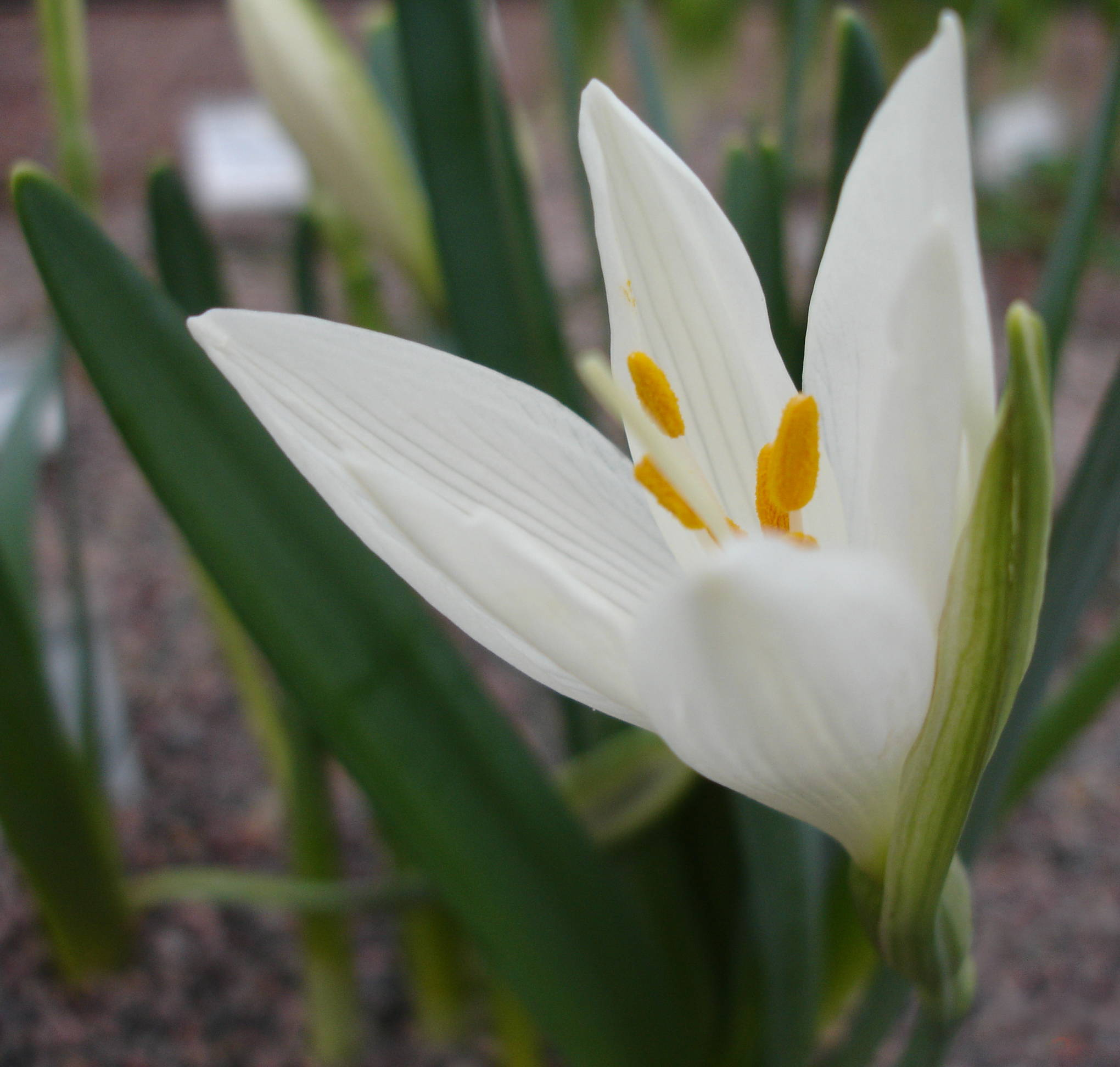
- CITES Appendix II

Scientific classification
- Kingdom: Plantae
- Clade: Embryophytes
- Clade: Tracheophytes
- Clade: Angiosperms
- Clade: Monocots
- Order: Asparagales
- Family: Amaryllidaceae
- Subfamily: Amaryllidoideae
- Genus: Sternbergia
- Species: S. candida

Binomial name
- Sternbergia candida B.Mathew & T.Baytop

= Sternbergia candida =

Species of flowering plant

Sternbergia candida is a bulbous flowering plant in the family Amaryllidaceae, subfamily Amaryllidoideae, which is used as an ornamental. This rare bulbous plant is native only to south-west Turkey, where it grows at around 1,100 m (3,600 ft) elevation on the edges of cedar woods. First discovered shortly before being formally named in 1979, it features sweet-scented white flowers that appear in spring, distinguishing it from the otherwise yellow-flowered members of its genus.

== Description ==
Sternbergia candida is a rare plant which occurs only in south-west Turkey, where it grows at around 1,100 m (3,600 ft), on the edges of cedar woods. It was only discovered a few years before being named in 1979 (by Brian Mathew and Turhan Baytop). The slightly twisted grey-green leaves appear in late winter to early spring and are about 1 cm wide. White flowers follow the leaves, normally in January to February in their native habitat, on stems up to 20 cm (7.9 in). The flowers may be scented.

The bulb of Sternbergia candida is 2–3 cm across yet produces some of the showiest flowers in the genus. Four flat, ribbon-like leaves (8–15 mm wide) emerge with the bloom; they are grey-green, sometimes faintly keeled beneath, and may twist slightly along their length. The white, sweet-scented flower sits almost stemless atop a tube barely 5 mm long but is held well above the soil on a scape that can reach 15–20 cm (5.9–7.9 in). Each segment of the perianth measures roughly 4.3–5 × 0.9–1.8 cm, giving the blossom a broader, more open funnel than that of its close relative S. fischeriana. A long, papery spathe (about 5 cm), filaments 13–16 mm and seeds equipped with large, ant-attracting food bodies (elaiosomes) complete the diagnostic suite. These features, together with the perfume and pure colour, make the species readily recognisable among the otherwise yellow-flowered gold crocuses.

== Habitat and distribution ==
Sternbergia candida is confined to a handful of limestone outcrops near Fethiye in south-western Turkey, where it occupies semi-shaded, stony clearings on the fringes of cedar (Cedrus libani) woodland and surrounding maquis shrubland up to about 1,100 m (3,600 ft) elevation. The type collection was made in January 1979, and subsequent fieldwork indicated that the total area of occupancy is extremely small; heavy digging by commercial bulb hunters poses an immediate threat. Given the combination of a single known locality, intense collecting pressure and slow vegetative increase, the species is regarded as highly vulnerable in the wild.

== Cultivation ==
Sternbergia candida is not reliably hardy in countries subject to frost and is then recommended for culture under the protection of at least a cold greenhouse or frame. It is propagated by bulb division. The plant is regarded as one of the more challenging Sternbergia species to maintain in cultivation, largely owing to its exacting moisture and temperature requirements. Successful flowering typically follows deep planting in a sharply draining, lime-rich growing medium, a prolonged dry–warm summer dormancy, and the gradual reintroduction of moisture and cooler conditions in autumn and winter. Under these conditions—often provided in alpine houses or cold frames—plants may produce single, fragrant white flowers from January through March, accompanied by a rosette of evergreen leaves that persist until early summer. Offset production is slow and irregular, and clumps seldom increase rapidly unless the bulbs are afforded additional potassium and magnesium during active growth.
