= Colchicum baytopiorum =

Scientific classification
- Kingdom: Plantae
- Clade: Tracheophytes
- Clade: Angiosperms
- Clade: Monocots
- Order: Liliales
- Family: Colchicaceae
- Genus: Colchicum
- Species: C. baytopiorum

Binomial name
- Colchicum baytopiorum C.D.Brickell

Species of flowering plant

Colchicum baytopiorum is a plant species native to western Turkey and to the Greek island of Rhodes (although possibly extinct there). It has small, bright pink-purple flowers measuring 4 cm (1.5") across. It is unusual in the genus in producing small leaves in autumn while in bloom, as opposed to producing leaves in spring. It has a chromosome number of 46, 54 or 108. The species was named in honor of Turkish botanist Asuman Baytop.
