= Allium baytopiorum =

Baytop's onion

Conservation status
- Critically Endangered (IUCN 3.1)

Scientific classification
- Kingdom: Plantae
- Clade: Embryophytes
- Clade: Tracheophytes
- Clade: Spermatophytes
- Clade: Angiosperms
- Clade: Monocots
- Order: Asparagales
- Family: Amaryllidaceae
- Subfamily: Allioideae
- Genus: Allium
- Species: A. baytopiorum

Binomial name
- Allium baytopiorum Kollmann & Özhatay

Species of flowering plant

Allium baytopiorum, or Baytop's onion, is a species of onion that is endemic to Kars Province in Turkey. It is found in montane steppe at about 1,200 metres (3,900 ft) elevation. The species was named in honor of Turkish botanist Asuman Baytop.

== Endangerment ==
The ICUN has listed Baytop's onion as critically endangered as its population is threatened by overgrazing and hay making.
