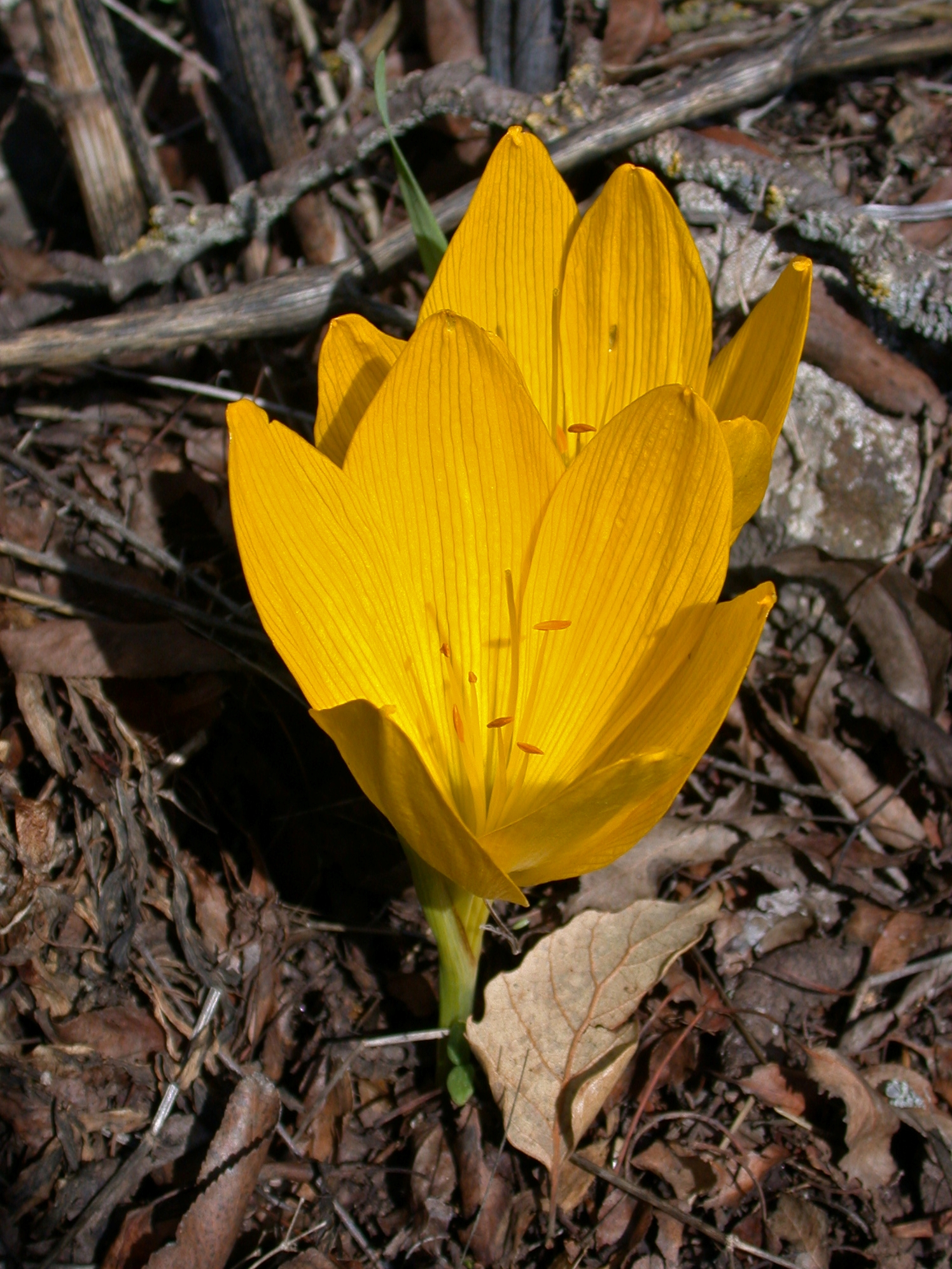
- CITES Appendix II

Scientific classification
- Kingdom: Plantae
- Clade: Tracheophytes
- Clade: Angiosperms
- Clade: Monocots
- Order: Asparagales
- Family: Amaryllidaceae
- Subfamily: Amaryllidoideae
- Genus: Sternbergia
- Species: S. clusiana

Binomial name
- Sternbergia clusiana (Ker Gawl.) Ker Gawl. ex Spreng.

Synonyms
- Amaryllis clusiana Ker Gawl.; Oporanthus clusianus (Ker Gawl.) Herb.; Oporanthus macranthus J.Gay; Sternbergia grandiflora Boiss. ex Baker, pro syn.; Sternbergia latifolia Boiss. & Hausskn. ex Baker; Sternbergia macrantha (J.Gay) J.Gay ex Baker; Sternbergia sparffiordiana Dinsm.; Sternbergia stipitata Boiss. & Hausskn.

= Sternbergia clusiana =

Species of flowering plant in the amaryllis family

Sternbergia clusiana is a bulbous flowering plant in the family Amaryllidaceae, subfamily Amaryllidoideae, which is sometimes used as an ornamental plant. It has greenish-yellow flowers which appear in autumn.

== Description ==
Sternbergia clusiana is native to the East Aegean Islands, Iran, Iraq, Lebanon-Syria, the Palestine region and Turkey. It grows in dry stony areas, including fields. The greenish-yellow flowers are produced in late autumn (October to November in their natural habitats). They are the largest flowers in the genus, with tepals of up to 7 cm (2.8 in) plus a slightly shorter tube. The grey-green leaves, which are 8–16 mm wide, appear after the flowers, in winter or early spring.

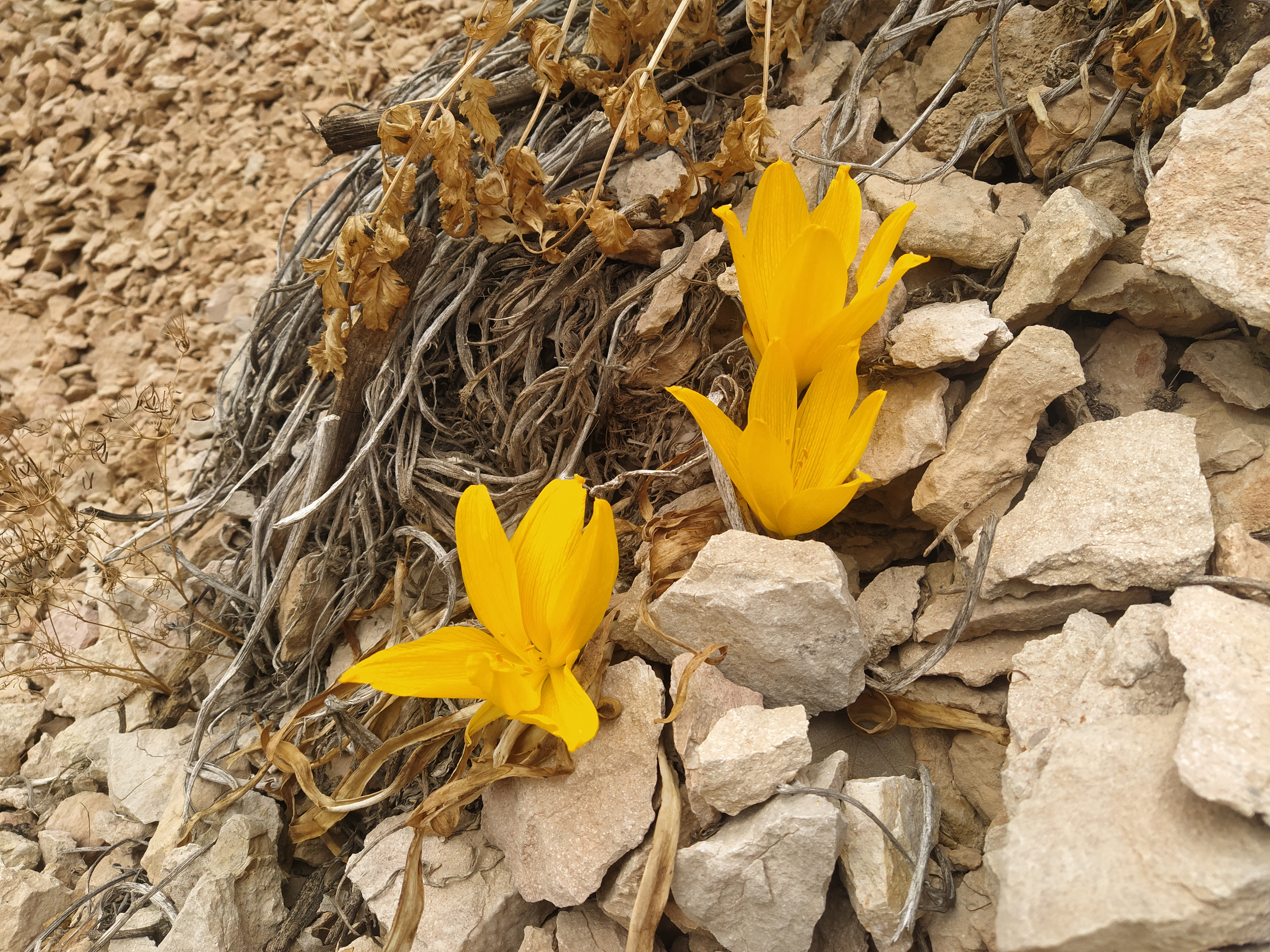
In Zagros, Iran

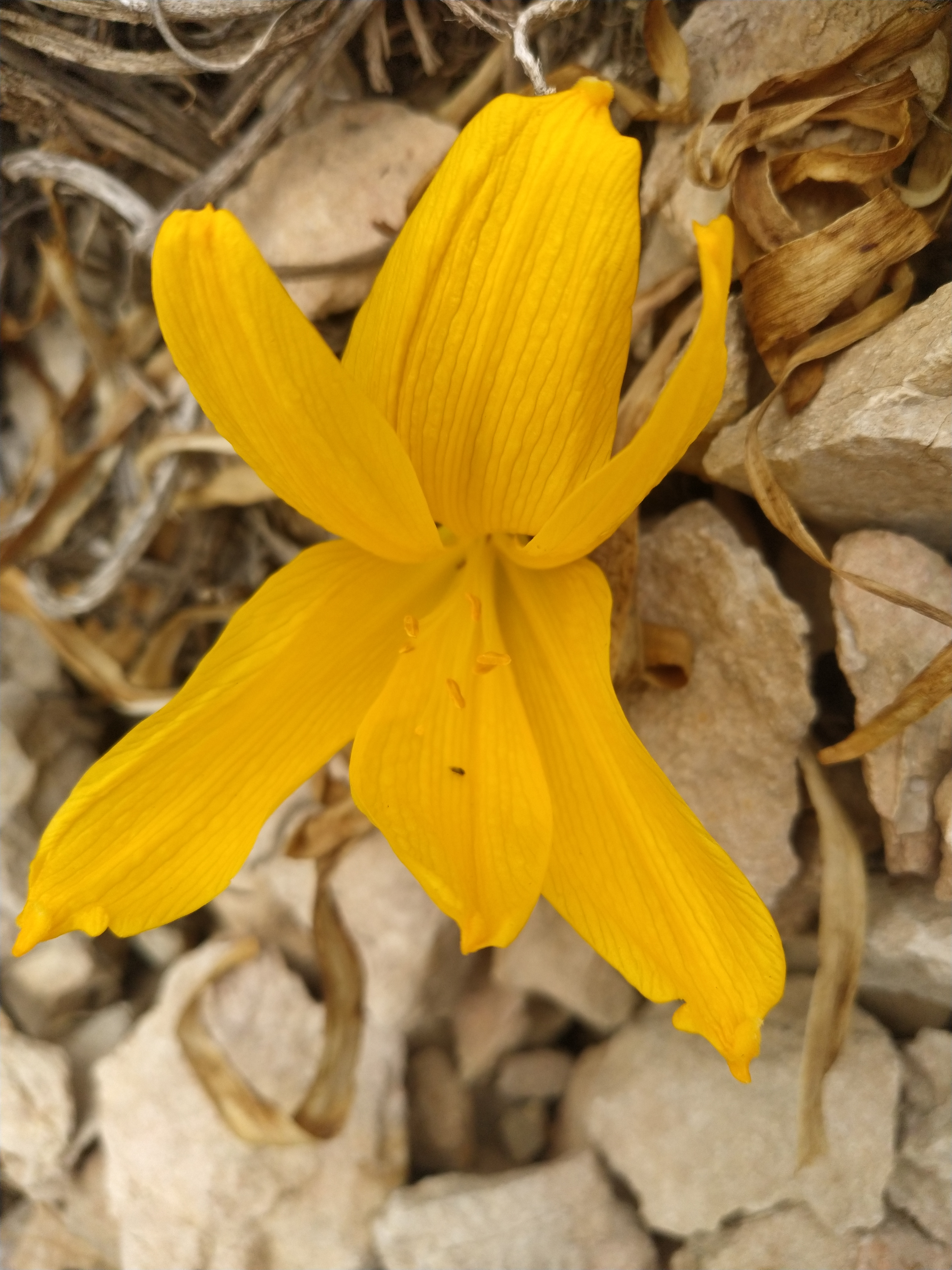
In Zagros, Iran

== Cultivation ==
Sternbergia clusiana is not hardy in countries subject to frost. In that case, protection of a cold greenhouse or frame is recommended. It is propagated by bulb division.
