= Sternbergia minoica =

- CITES Appendix II

Scientific classification
- Kingdom: Plantae
- Clade: Embryophytes
- Clade: Tracheophytes
- Clade: Spermatophytes
- Clade: Angiosperms
- Clade: Monocots
- Order: Asparagales
- Family: Amaryllidaceae
- Subfamily: Amaryllidoideae
- Genus: Sternbergia
- Species: S. minoica

Binomial name
- Sternbergia minoica Ravenna

Species of flowering plant

Sternbergia minoica is a flowering plant species in the family Amaryllidaceae. It is endemic to the Island of Crete in the Mediterranean.
