= Sternbergia vernalis =

- CITES Appendix I (CITES)

Scientific classification
- Kingdom: Plantae
- Clade: Tracheophytes
- Clade: Angiosperms
- Clade: Monocots
- Order: Asparagales
- Family: Amaryllidaceae
- Subfamily: Amaryllidoideae
- Genus: Sternbergia
- Species: S. vernalis

Binomial name
- Sternbergia vernalis (Mill.) Gorer & J.H.Harvey

Synonyms
- S. fischeriana (Herb.) Roem.

Species of flowering plant in the amaryllis family

Sternbergia vernalis is a bulbous flowering plant in the family Amaryllidaceae, subfamily Amaryllidoideae, which is sometimes used as an ornamental plant. It has yellow flowers which appear in spring. The species is native to central and southwestern Asia (Turkmenistan, Tajikistan, Uzbekistan, Armenia, Azerbaijan, Georgia, Iran, Iraq, Lebanon, Syria and Turkey).
