= Sternbergia pulchella =

Conservation status
- Data Deficient (IUCN 3.1)
- CITES Appendix II

Scientific classification
- Kingdom: Plantae
- Clade: Embryophytes
- Clade: Tracheophytes
- Clade: Spermatophytes
- Clade: Angiosperms
- Clade: Monocots
- Order: Asparagales
- Family: Amaryllidaceae
- Subfamily: Amaryllidoideae
- Genus: Sternbergia
- Species: S. pulchella

Binomial name
- Sternbergia pulchella Boiss. & Blanche in P.E.Boissier

Species of flowering plant

Sternbergia pulchella is a bulbous flowering plant in the family Amaryllidaceae, subfamily Amaryllidoideae. It has yellow flowers which appear in autumn. The species is native to Syria and Lebanon.
