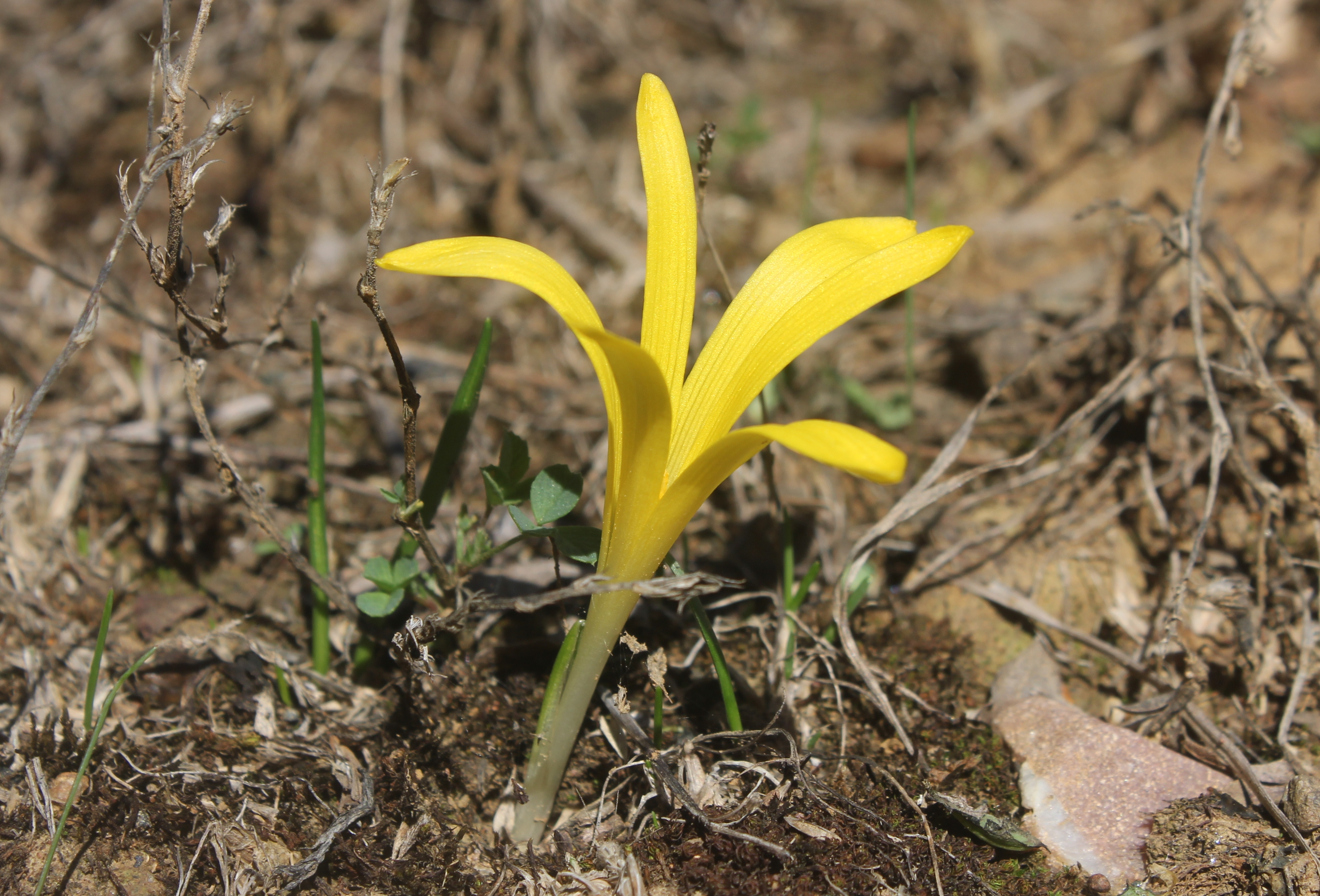

Conservation status
- Least Concern (IUCN 3.1)
- CITES Appendix II

Scientific classification
- Kingdom: Plantae
- Clade: Tracheophytes
- Clade: Angiosperms
- Clade: Monocots
- Order: Asparagales
- Family: Amaryllidaceae
- Subfamily: Amaryllidoideae
- Genus: Sternbergia
- Species: S. colchiciflora

Binomial name
- Sternbergia colchiciflora Waldst. & Kit.

Synonyms
- S. alexandrae Sosn.; S. citrina (Herb.) Ker Gawl. ex Schult. & Schult.f. in J.J.Roemer & J.A.Schultes; S. etnensis (Raf.) Guss.; S. exscapa Tineo in G.Gussone

= Sternbergia colchiciflora =

Species of flowering plant in the amaryllis family

Sternbergia colchiciflora is a bulbous flowering plant in the family Amaryllidaceae, subfamily Amaryllidoideae, which is sometimes used as an ornamental plant, commonly known as babaluschka. The species is native to southern Europe from Spain to Russia (in the Stavropol and Krasnodar Krai regions, as well as in the Chechen Republic), as well as from Morocco, Algeria, Turkey, Syria, Lebanon, the Palestine region, Iran and the Caucasus. It has yellow flowers which appear in autumn.

== Description ==
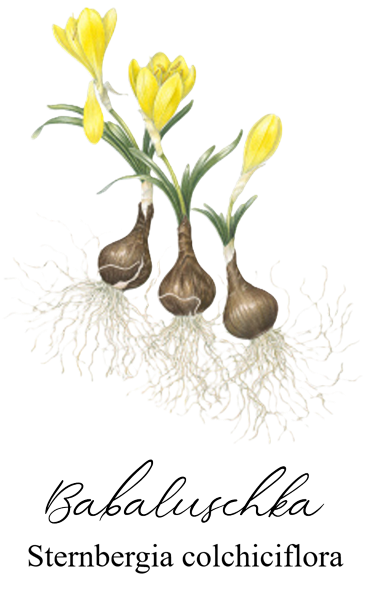
Botanical illustration of a babaluschka, showing roots and flower structure

Sternbergia colchiciflora is the smallest member of the autumn-flowering "gold crocuses". Each bulb is scarcely 0.5–1.5 cm (0.20–0.59 in) in diameter and sends up three to six thread-like leaves after the plant has flowered. The foliage is 1–4 mm wide, blue-green to dark green and often twists into a loose spiral as it elongates over winter. Its solitary flower appears directly from the ground between September and November and is carried on a very short, subterranean stalk. The narrow yellow perianth tube measures roughly 18–27 mm; the six outer segments are only 2.3–3.3 cm long and 2–5 mm wide, giving the bloom a distinctly slender outline. Because both ovary and young capsule develop safely below soil level, the species is able to set seed even when bad weather prevents insect visits: the unopened flower can self-pollinate underground (kleistogamy). By early spring the capsule is pushed a centimetre or two above the surface, where the seeds—each tipped with a fleshy food-body—are collected by ants and dispersed locally.

== In popular culture ==
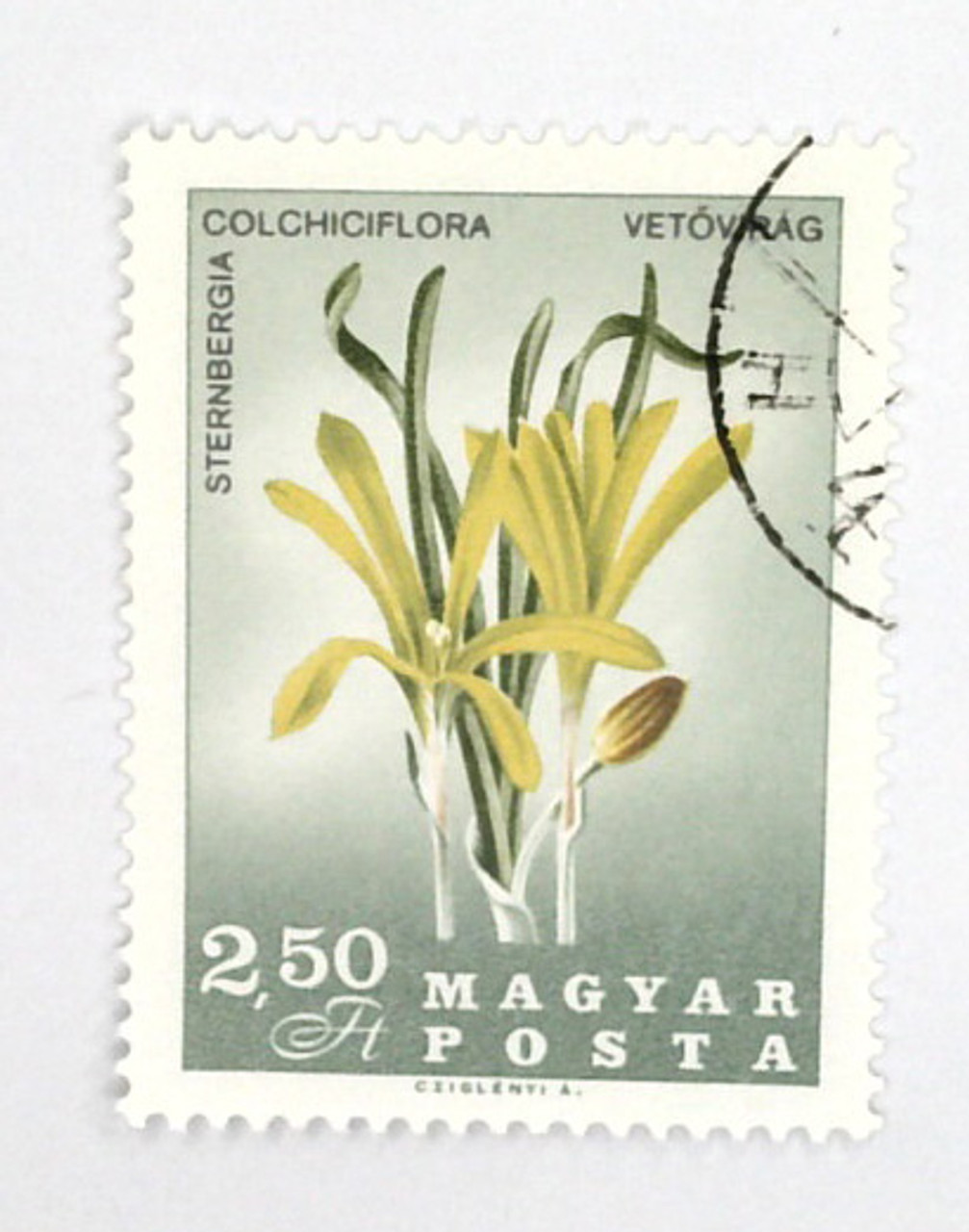
Hungary - Postal Stamp -1816 - Babaluschka (Sternbergia colchiciflora)

Sternbergia colchiciflora was featured on a Hungarian postage stamp in 1981.

== Distribution and habitat ==
The species ranges widely from south-eastern Spain through the Balkans and Italy to the Caucasus, the Iranian plateau and western Turkey, inhabiting open, rocky grassland, light scrub and field margins on well-drained calcareous soils between 150 m (490 ft) and about 2,300 m (7,500 ft) elevation. In Mediterranean and steppe climates the bulb endures a long, hot summer dormancy; once autumn rain arrives a brief display of slender, pale to deep-yellow flowers may sprinkle otherwise brown turf. Its minute stature and tendency to hide its blossoms beneath surrounding vegetation mean natural populations are often overlooked, but the plant compensates with reliable seed production and can form loose colonies on undisturbed ground. In gardens it succeeds only if given an extended, warm, absolutely dry rest and a gritty, lime-rich compost; several bulbs planted together in a pot or the sunniest, most free-draining pocket of a rock garden make the discreet display easier to appreciate.

== Gallery ==
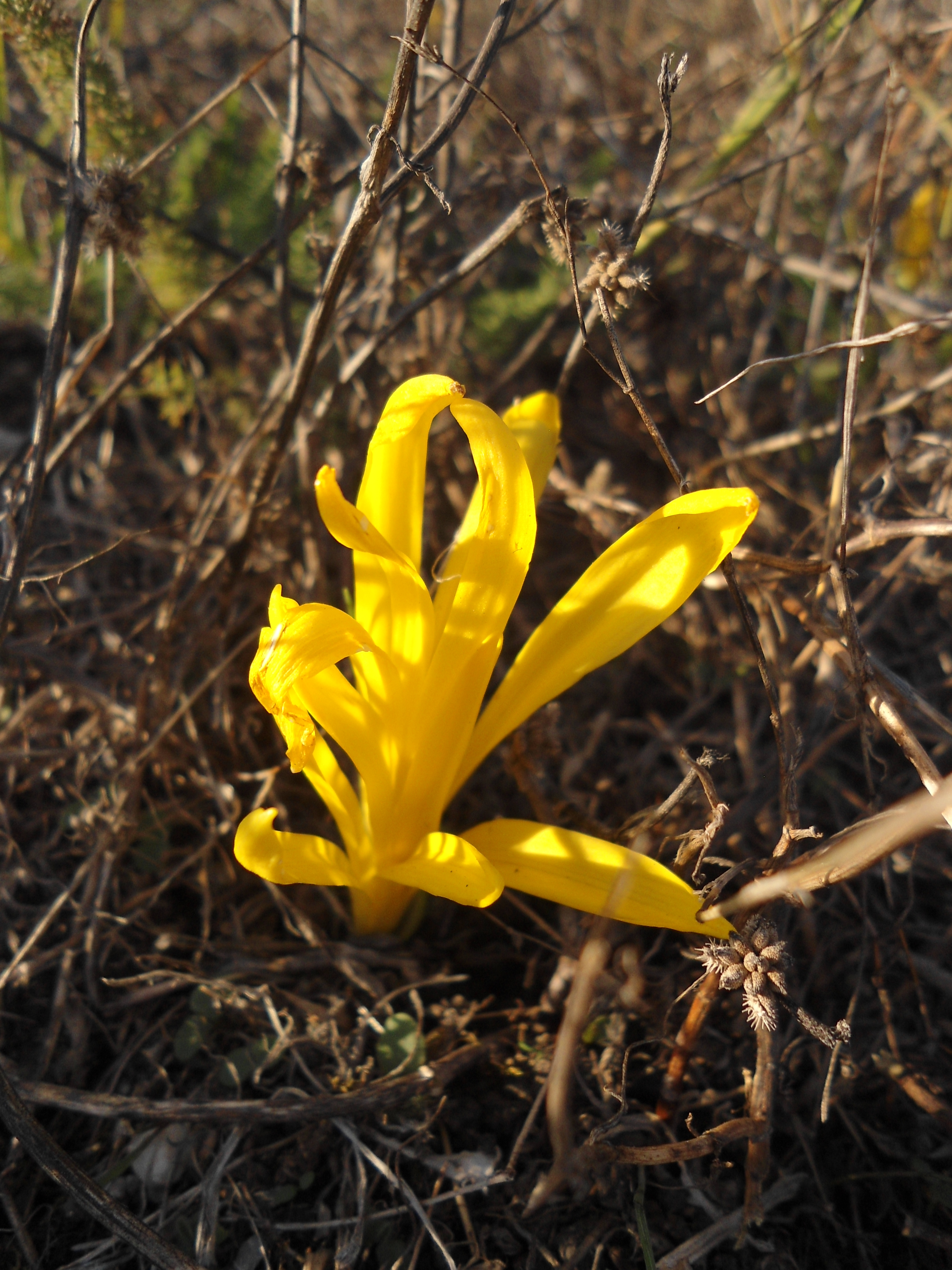
Side profile

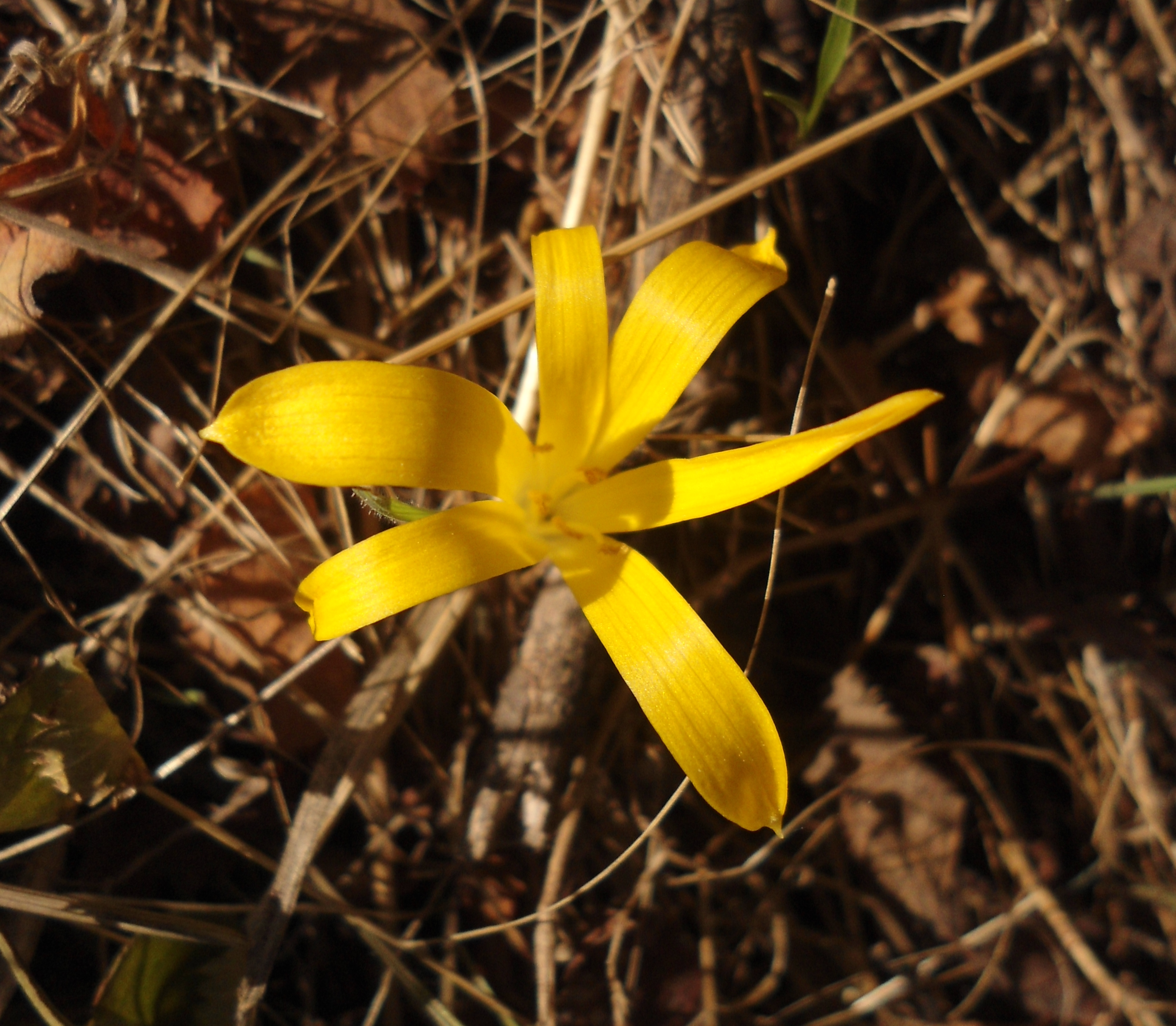
From above
