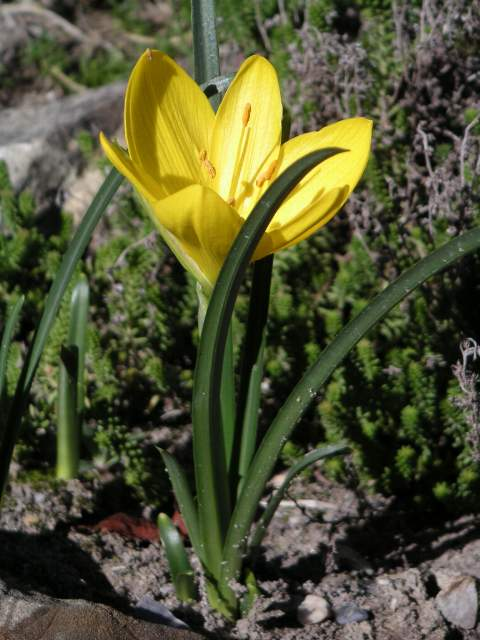
- Sternbergia lutea
- CITES Appendix II

Scientific classification
- Kingdom: Plantae
- Clade: Embryophytes
- Clade: Tracheophytes
- Clade: Spermatophytes
- Clade: Angiosperms
- Clade: Monocots
- Order: Asparagales
- Family: Amaryllidaceae
- Subfamily: Amaryllidoideae
- Genus: Sternbergia; Waldst. & Kit.

Type species
- Sternbergia colchiciflora Waldst.

Synonyms
- Oporanthus Herb.

= Sternbergia =

Genus of flowering plants

Sternbergia is a genus of Eurasian and North African plants in the Amaryllis family, subfamily Amaryllidoideae. The genus comprises eight recognised species that show a broad distribution throughout the Mediterranean Basin as well as central and southwestern Asia.

== Description ==
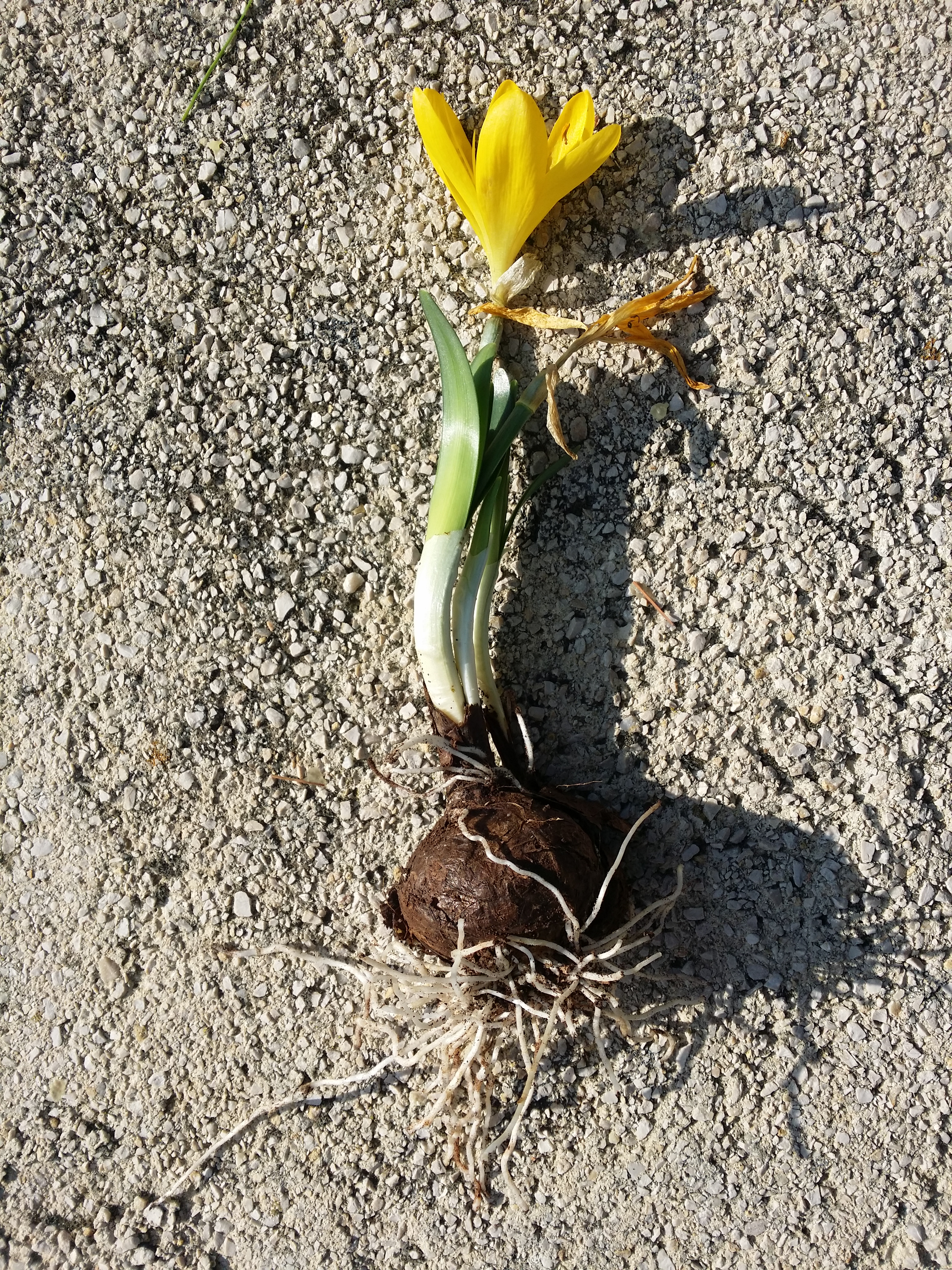
Flowering Sternbergia lutea

=== Vegetative characteristics ===
Sternbergia are small, bulbous, perennial plants with tunicate bulbs and linear to strap-shaped leaves. The membranous tunics are black or brown.

=== Generative characteristics ===
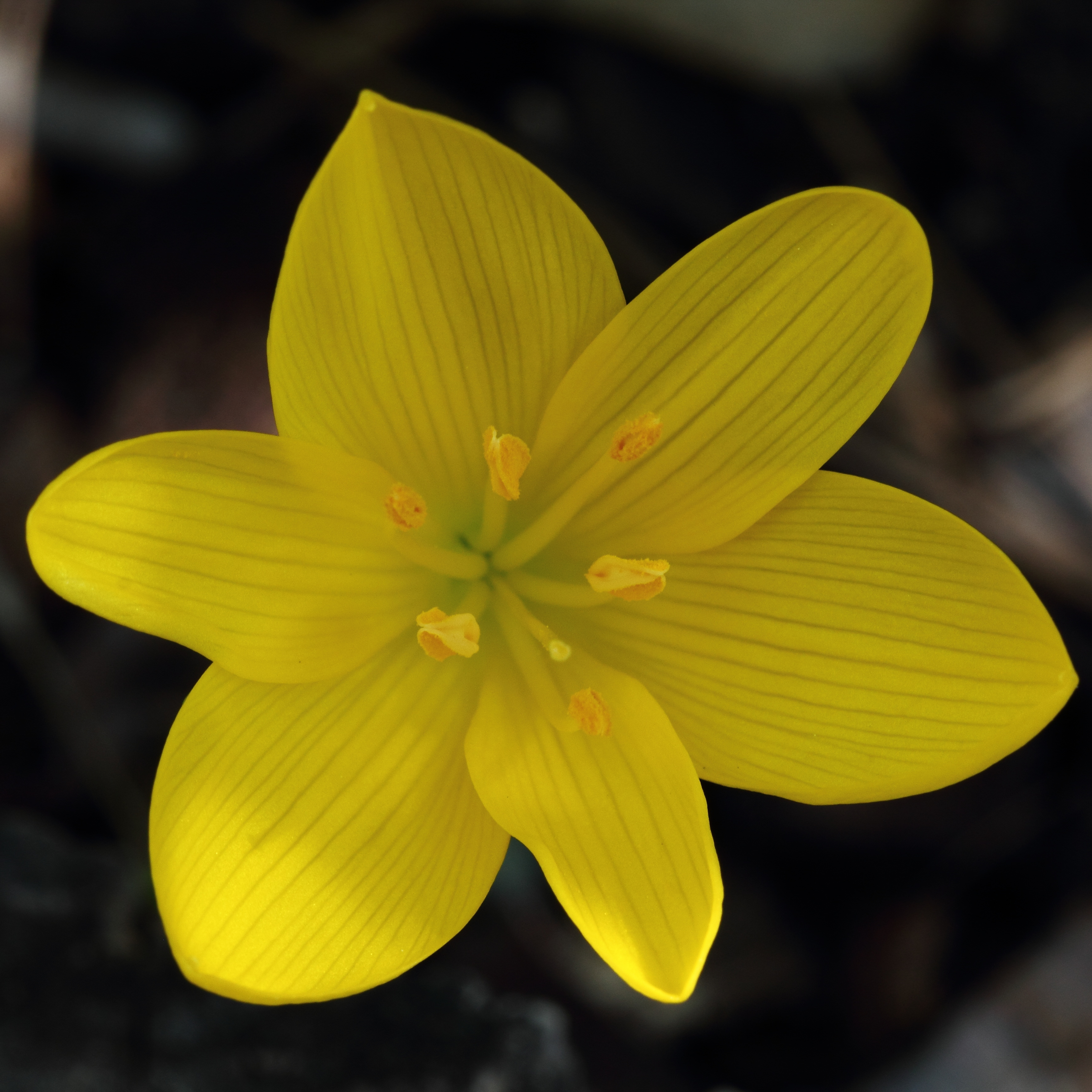
The six stamens and style of Sternbergia lutea

Sternbergia contains a number of species of flowering bulbs which rather resemble Crocus. These plants produce golden-yellow goblet-shaped flowers borne on stalks some way above the ground that open during the autumn or early winter. The flower is composed of six stamens and a single style attached to an inferior ovary. Long, strap-like leaves may appear with the flowers or sometime after. The only two exceptions to this are S. vernalis and S. candida which flower in the spring, with S. candida producing striking white flowers.

The genus has gained notability due to the widespread use of one of its species, S. lutea, as a garden plant. This species has been found in cultivation for several hundred years, and has become naturalised in many parts of northern Europe, well beyond its natural range.

=== Cytology ===
The chromosome count is 2n = 20 or 2n = 22.

== Taxonomy ==
Sternbergia lutea was first described in 1601 by Clusius, who included the plants in the genus Narcissus. Carl Linnaeus in 1753 regarded them as part of Amaryllis. It was not until 1825 that the species was transferred to Sternbergia, using the generic name coined in 1804.

=== Etymology ===
The genus name Sternbergia honours the botanist Kaspar Maria von Sternberg.

=== Species ===
As of April 2015, the World Checklist of Selected Plant Families recognizes eight species:

- Sternbergia candida B.Mathew & T.Baytop – Turkey
- Sternbergia clusiana (Ker Gawl.) Ker Gawl. ex Spreng., including S. grandiflora Boiss. ex Baker, S. latifolia Boiss. & Hausskn. ex Baker, S. macrantha (J.Gay) J.Gay ex Baker, S. sparffiordiana Dinsm., S. stipitata Boiss. & Hausskn. – Aegean Islands, Middle East
- Sternbergia colchiciflora Waldst. & Kit., including S. alexandrae Sosn., S. citrina (Herb.) Ker Gawl. ex Schult. & Schult.f., S. etnensis (Raf.) Guss., S. exscapa Tineo in G.Gussone – southern + southeastern Europe from Spain to Ukraine; Morocco, Algeria, Caucasus, Middle East
- Sternbergia lutea (L.) Ker Gawl. ex Spreng., including S. aurantiaca Dinsm., S. sicula Tineo ex Guss, S. greuteriana Kamari & R.Artelari – southern Europe from Spain to Balkans; Middle East, Caucasus, Turkmenistan, Tajikistan; naturalized in North Africa
- Sternbergia minoica Ravenna Autumn daffodil – Crete
- Sternbergia pulchella Boiss. & Blanche in P.E.Boissier – Syria, Lebanon
- Sternbergia schubertii Schenk – İzmir Province in western Turkey
- Sternbergia vernalis (Mill.) Gorer & J.H.Harvey, including S. fischeriana (Herb.) Roem. – Middle East, Caucasus, Central Asia

Formerly included

Three names have been coined using the name Sternbergia but referring to species now considered better suited to other genera (Colchicum, Narcissus and Zephyranthes). We provide links to help you find appropriate information.

- Sternbergia americana – Zephyranthes americana
- Sternbergia caucasica – Colchicum trigynum
- Sternbergia exigua – Narcissus cavanillesii

== Conservation ==
The trade of Sternbergia is regulated by the Convention on International Trade in Endangered Species of Wild Fauna and Flora, as it is included in the CITES Appendix II. The IUCN conservation status of Sternbergia pulchella is Data Deficient (DD).
