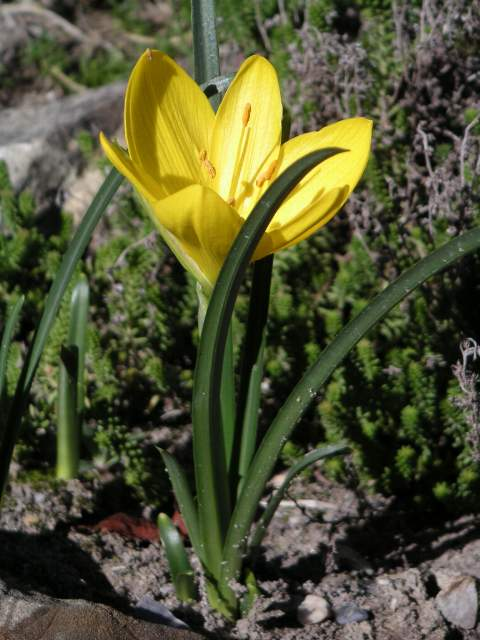
- CITES Appendix II

Scientific classification
- Kingdom: Plantae
- Clade: Embryophytes
- Clade: Tracheophytes
- Clade: Spermatophytes
- Clade: Angiosperms
- Clade: Monocots
- Order: Asparagales
- Family: Amaryllidaceae
- Subfamily: Amaryllidoideae
- Genus: Sternbergia
- Species: S. lutea

Binomial name
- Sternbergia lutea (L.) Ker-Gawl. ex Spreng.

Synonyms
- Amaryllis lutea L. (1753); Oporanthus luteus (L.) Herb. (1821)

= Sternbergia lutea =

Species of flowering plant

Sternbergia lutea, the winter daffodil, autumn daffodil, fall daffodil, lily-of-the-field, or yellow autumn crocus, (Note: Though it does not belong to the same family as the crocus.) is a bulbous flowering plant in the family Amaryllidaceae, subfamily Amaryllidoideae, in the Narcisseae tribe, which is used as an ornamental plant. It has yellow flowers which appear in autumn.

The Latin specific epithet lutea means "yellow".

== Description ==
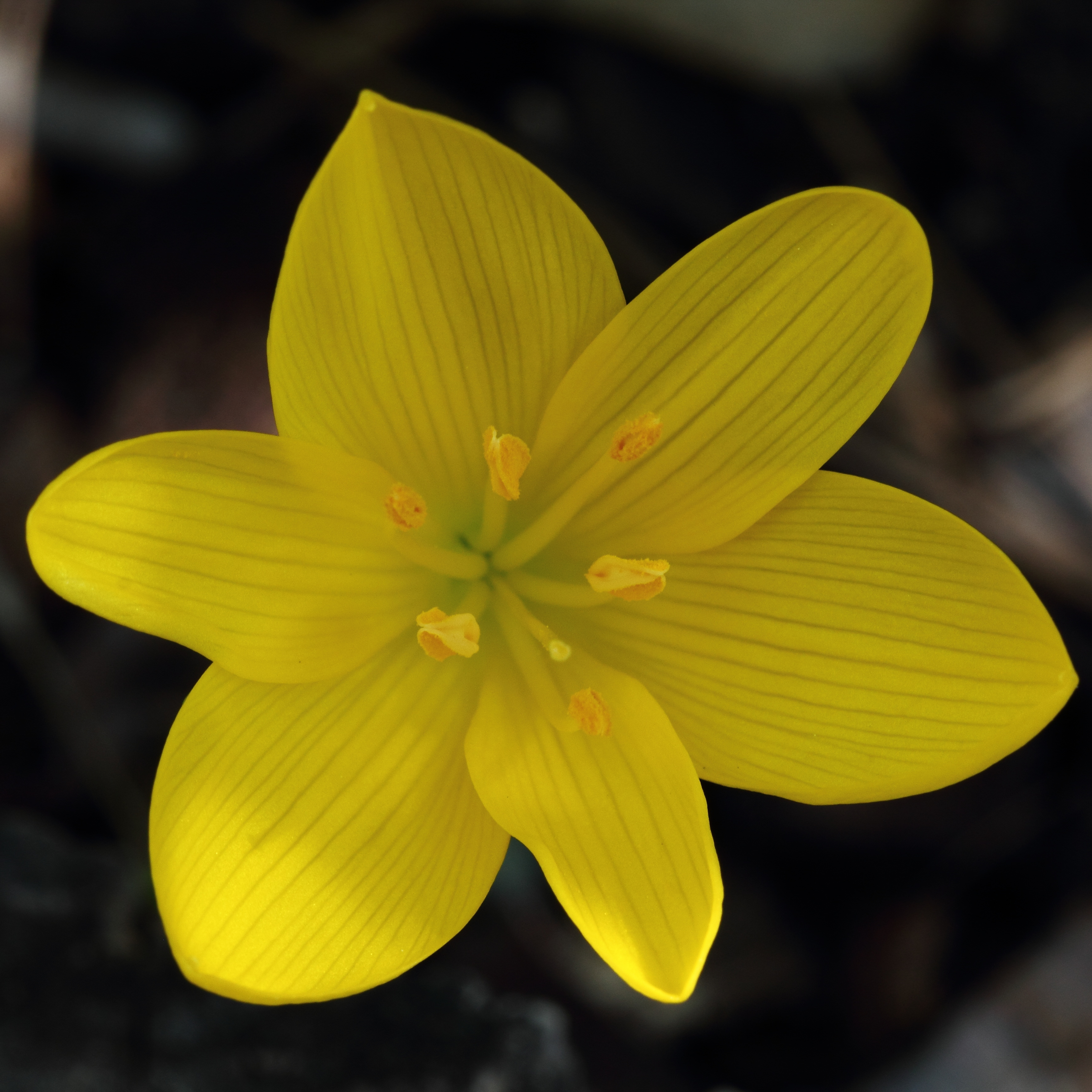
The six grey-striated tepals, the six yellow stamens, and the style with its stigma

Sternbergia lutea has a wide distribution from the Balearic Islands in the Western Mediterranean through to Tajikistan in Central Asia. It dies down to a bulb during the summer. Leaves first appear in the autumn (September to November in its native habitats), and are glossy green, up to 12 mm wide; they remain through the winter.

Deep yellow flowers appear soon after the leaves, with six tepals around 3–3.5 cm long, six yellow stamens and a style with a single stigma.

Smaller forms with narrower leaves (up to 5 mm wide) and narrower tepals (3–12 mm rather than 10–20 mm) have been separated off under various names (e.g. S. lutea var. graeca, S. sicula).

== Subspecies ==
Three subspecies are accepted.

- Sternbergia lutea subsp. greuteriana (Kamari & R.Artelari) Strid (synonyms Sternbergia greuteriana Kamari & R.Artelari and S. minoica Ravenna) – Crete
- Sternbergia lutea subsp. lutea (synonyms Sternbergia angustifolia Krelage and S. aurantiaca Dinsm) – southern Europe to western Asia, the Caucasus, and Tajikistan
- Sternbergia lutea subsp. sicula (Tineo ex Guss.) K.Richt. (synonyms Oporanthus siculus (Tineo ex Guss.) Parl. and S. sicula Tineo ex Guss.) – Italy, Sicily, Greece, Crete, and western Turkey

== Cultivation ==
Sternbergia lutea is hardy to USDA hardiness zones 7–9 (−18 to −1 °C) depending on the degree of protection given. It can be grown outside in the British Isles in well-drained soil; a warm dry period in summer is required for good flowering. Alkaline soils are recommended. Bulbs are usually planted while dormant (i.e. in late summer or early autumn), but can be lifted and divided before the leaves die down in late spring.

This plant has gained the Royal Horticultural Society's Award of Garden Merit.

A vigorous form with narrow leaves is grown in gardens under the name S. lutea var. angustifolia.
