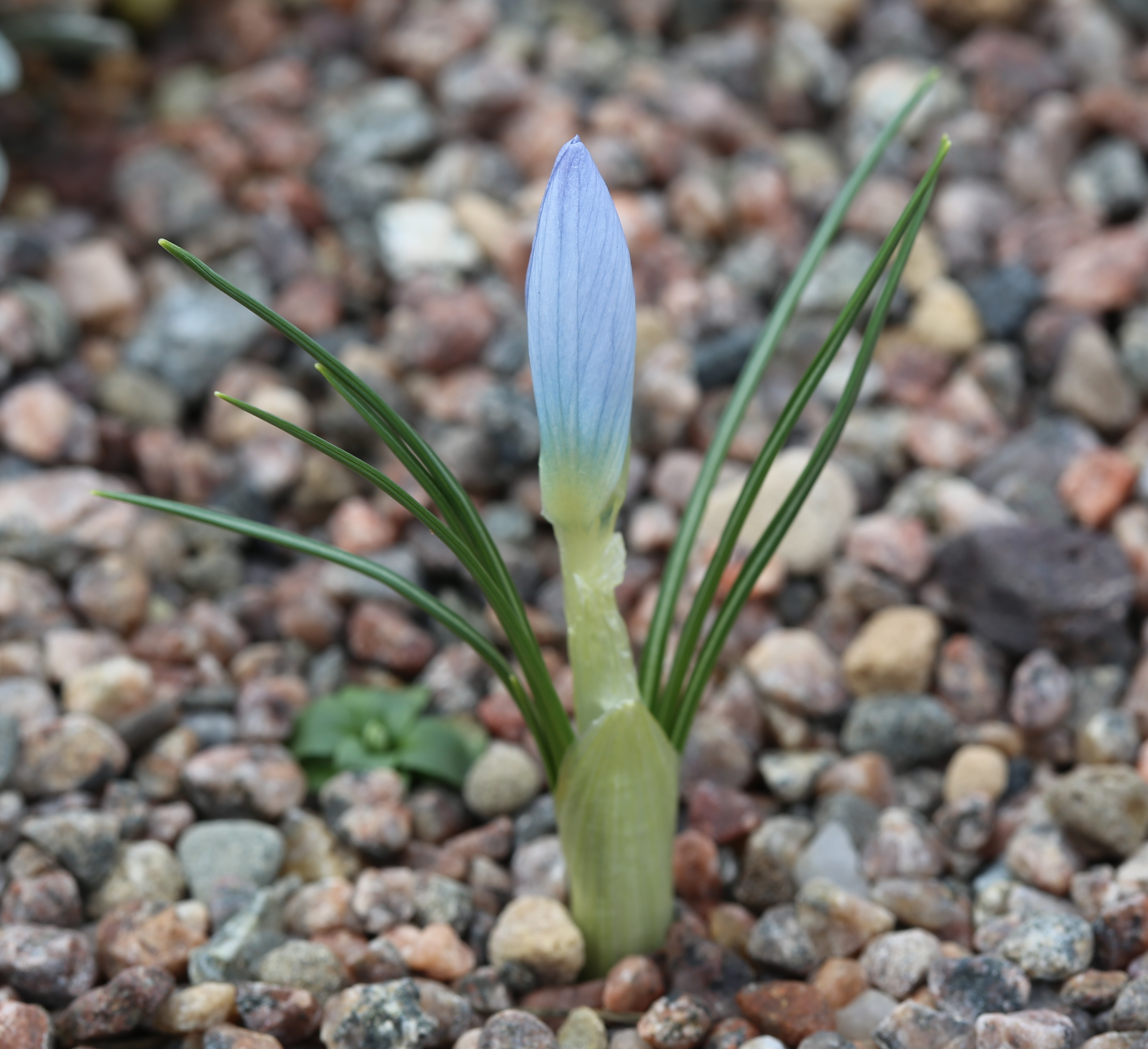

Scientific classification
- Kingdom: Plantae
- Clade: Tracheophytes
- Clade: Angiosperms
- Clade: Monocots
- Order: Asparagales
- Family: Iridaceae
- Genus: Crocus
- Species: C. baytopiorum

Binomial name
- Crocus baytopiorum B.Mathew

= Crocus baytopiorum =

Species of flowering plant

Crocus baytopiorum is a species of flowering plant in the genus Crocus of the family Iridaceae. It is a cormous perennial native to Turkey.

== Description ==
Crocus baytopiorum is a spring flowering herbaceous perennial geophyte growing from a corm. The 13 cm wide corm is a flatted egg shape. The tunic around the corm has thick fibers and is coarsely netted. A spathe (sheath that covers the flower before it opens) subtends the inflorescence. The pale blue flowers are distinctive. The arillate seeds are red with a pointed end.

== Habitat ==
Crocus baytopiorum is native to limestone screes, rocky gullies, in open pine and juniper woodland. Flowering occurs in February.

The species was named in honor of Professors Turhan & Asuman Baytop from Istanbul, who discovered it in 1973 and it was described by the Kew botanist Brian Mathew.
