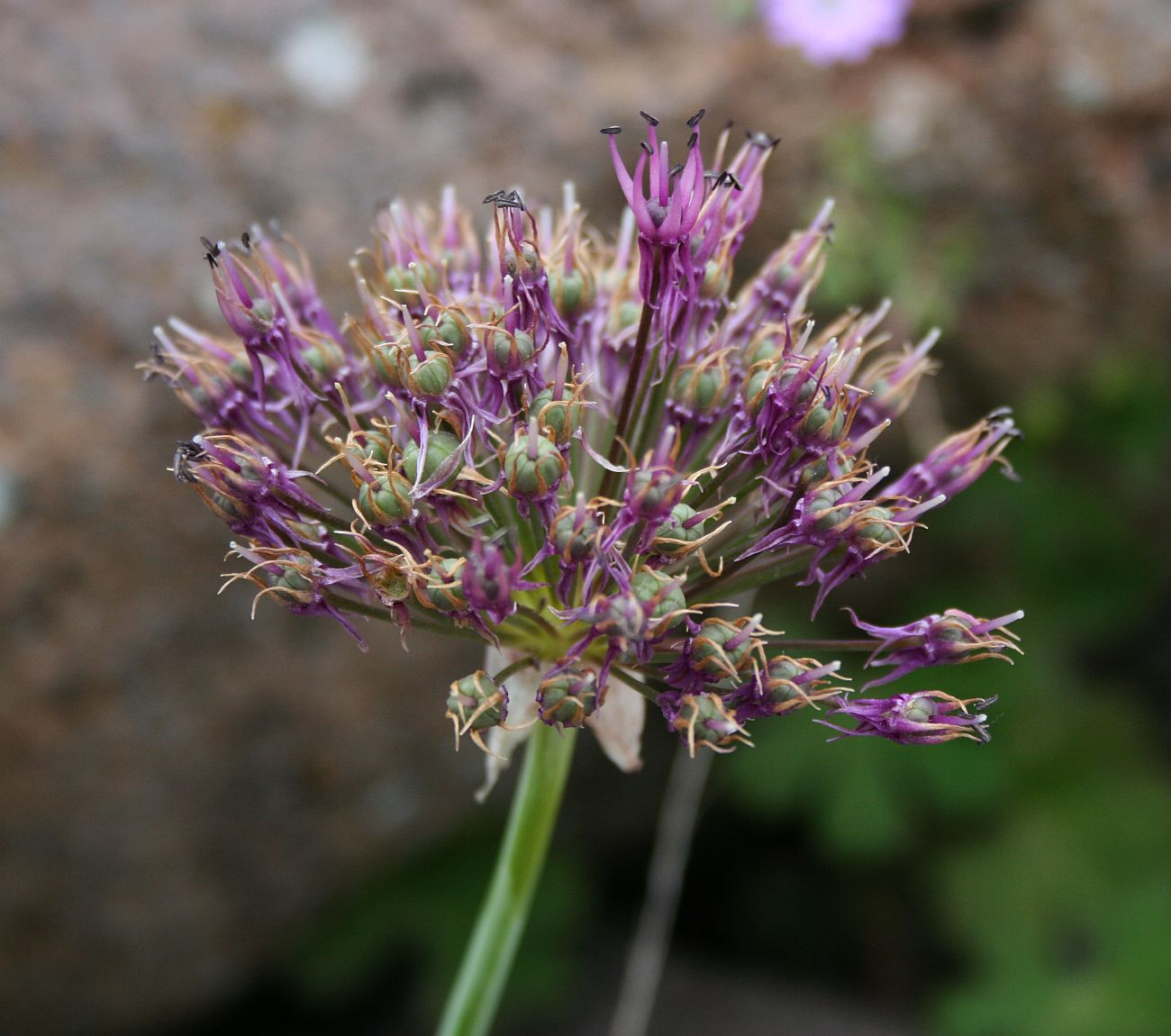
- Allium cyrilli subsp. asumaniae

Scientific classification
- Kingdom: Plantae
- Clade: Tracheophytes
- Clade: Angiosperms
- Clade: Monocots
- Order: Asparagales
- Family: Amaryllidaceae
- Subfamily: Allioideae
- Genus: Allium
- Subgenus: Allium subg. Melanocrommyum
- Species: A. cyrilli

Binomial name
- Allium cyrilli Ten.

Synonyms
- Allium auctum Omelczuk; Allium fragrans Cirillo ex Ten.; Allium nigrum var. cyrilli (Ten.) Fiori

= Allium cyrilli =

cyrillic garlic

Species of flowering plant

Allium cyrilli is a plant species native to Greece, Turkey, and to the Apulia region of southeastern Italy.

Allium cyrilli has one egg-shaped bulb wide, fleshy leaves that are U-shaped in cross section. Umbel consists of a large number of flowers crowded together, all with long fleshy pedicels. Scape is robust, up to 100 cm tall. Tepals are pale lavender with prominent green midstripes. These surround a large and conspicuous deep purple ovary with 3 lobes.
