= Turhan Baytop =

Turkish botanist (1920–2002)

- Born: June 20, 1920; Üsküdar, Istanbul, Ottoman Empire
- Died: June 25, 2002 (aged 82); Istanbul, Turkey
- Education: University College of Pharmacy in Istanbul
- Occupations: Botanist, pharmacist
- Spouse: Asuman Baytop

Turhan Baytop (June 20, 1920 – June 25, 2002) was a Turkish botanist and pharmacist from Istanbul.

He was born on June 20, 1920, at Üsküdar, Istanbul. His father was a military officer and a keen amateur botanist.

He then started studying at the 'University College of Pharmacy' in Istanbul in 1945 he graduated. He later served as a pharmacist in the medical corps during his military service. In 1948, Baytop returned to the college and gained his doctorate with a chemical investigation of Ephedra, the group of plants that contain important drugs such as ephedrine. This was followed by a similar study of a Turkish species of liquorice, Glycyrrhiza glabra.

He started working as an assistant at the Institute of Pharmacognosy of the school. With a thesis prepared in 1949 by Dr. pharm. Turhan Baytop winning the title, he went in 1951 to Paris to study pharmacology. In 1952, he returned to Turkey, the associate Baytop next year, ten years later, in 1963 received the title of professor. Istanbul University was the first dean of the Faculty of Pharmacy. Five-time dean did in different periods, 1969 - Between 1987 Pharmacognosy moment found at department chairman. Who retired in 1987. Prof. Turhan Baytop Turkey's medicinal plants, flora of Turkey and the Turkish pharmaceutical research and did study history. Books and over 300 published research. Istanbul University Faculty of Pharmacy of the "History of Pharmacy Museum," which established the Professor Baytop, many historical items in 1990 conferred this museum began regulation of the Turkish History of Pharmacy Meeting between 1984 -1996 in "Pharmacy History and Ethics" course, giving wrote a textbook. Botanical Turhan also interested in the science Baytop studied the tulips and roses of the past, this He wrote a book about it in English and translated into Japanese.

He was married to fellow botanist Asuman Baytop.

== Notable publications ==
- Türkiyenin Tibbi ve Zehirli Bitkileri, 1963
- Türkiye'de Bitkiler ile Tedavi, 1984, ISBN 975-420-021-1
- The Bulbous Plants of Turkey, 1984 (B.Mathew ile birlikte)
- Türk Eczacılık Tarihi, 1985
- İstanbul Lalesi, 1992
- Türkçe Bitki Adları Sözlüğü, 1994
- Eczahane'den Eczane'ye, 1995
- Laboratuvar'dan Fabrika'ya, 1997
- İstanbul Florası Araştırmaları, 2002, OCLC 54822782
- Türk Eczacılık Tarihi Araştırmaları, Anadolu Dağlarında 50 Yıl, 2000
- Türkiye'de Eski Bahçe Gülleri, 2001
- İstanbul Florası Araştırmaları, 2002
- Türkiye'de Eski Bahçe Gülleri, 2001
